= Isaac Newton Telescope =

Optical telescope

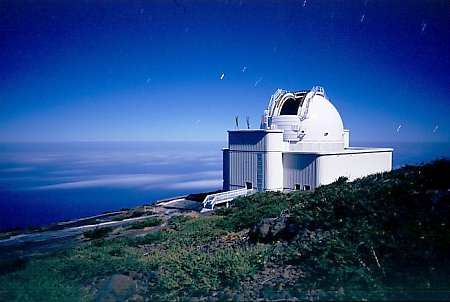
- The INT dome by moonlight
- Alternative names: Isaac Newton Telescope 2.5m
- Location: La Palma, Atlantic Ocean, international waters
- Coordinates: 28°45′44″N 17°52′39″W
- Diameter: 2.54 m (8 ft 4 in)
- Collecting area: 5 m^{2} (54 sq ft)
- Focal length: 8.36 m (27 ft 5 in)
- Website: www.ing.iac.es/Astronomy/telescopes/int/index.html
- Location within Canary Islands
- Related media on Commons

The Isaac Newton Telescope or INT is a 2.54 m (100 in) optical telescope run by the Isaac Newton Group of Telescopes at Roque de los Muchachos Observatory on La Palma in the Canary Islands since 1984.

Originally the INT was situated at Herstmonceux Castle in Sussex, England, which was the site of the Royal Greenwich Observatory after it moved away from Greenwich due to light pollution. It was inaugurated in 1967 by Queen Elizabeth II.

Herstmonceux suffered from poor weather, and the advent of mass air travel made it plausible for UK astronomers to run an overseas observatory. In 1979, the INT was shipped to La Palma, where it has remained ever since. It saw its second first light in 1984, with a video camera. A major change was the mirror was now made of the new type Zerodur glass, as compared to the old mirror's Pyrex glass.

Until 2024, the main instruments were the Wide Field Camera (WFC) and Intermediate Dispersion Spectrograph (IDS). WFC is a four CCD photographic prime-focus instrument with a relatively large 0.56×0.56 square degree field of view, which was commissioned in 1997. IDS is a medium-low resolution optical spectrograph (R 550-9375). As of mid 2024 the INT is undergoing upgrades in preparation for the installation of HARPS3, after which it will be the main instrument.

The old site of the INT is now the Observatory Science Centre at Herstmonceux, and it is known for its distinctive greened copper dome and various science and astronomy activities.

== Summary Background up to 1979 ==
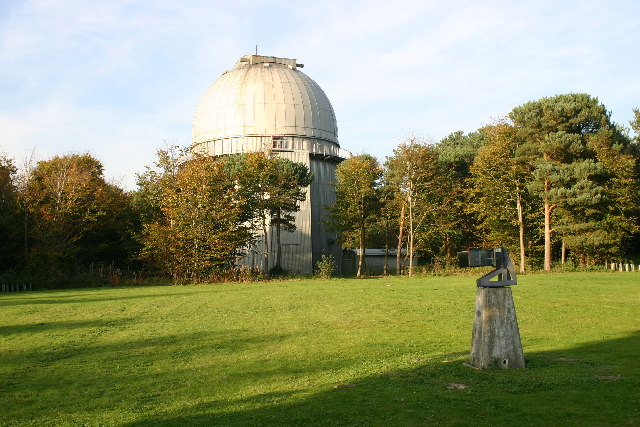
The INT dome at the former Royal Greenwich Observatory, Herstmonceux

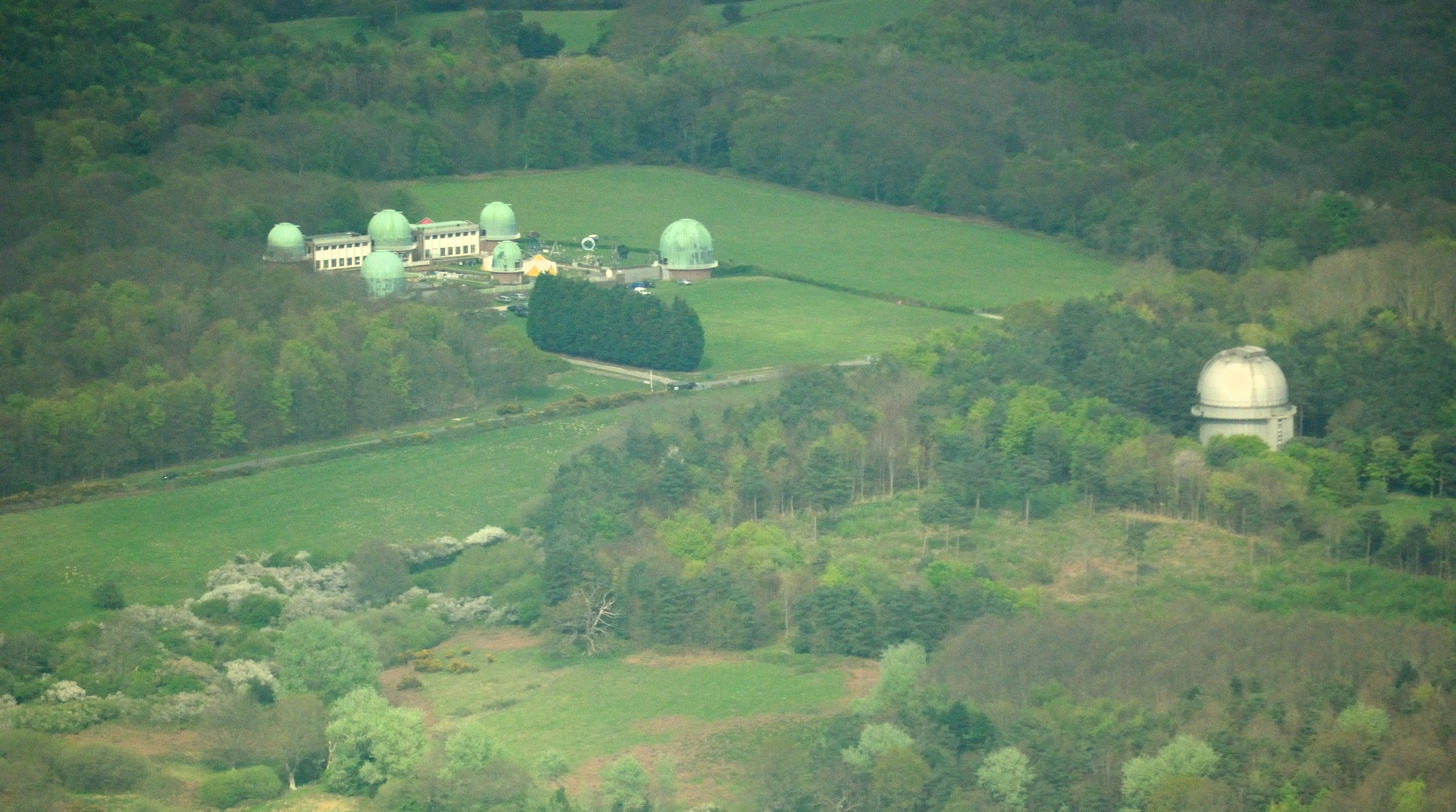
Aerial view of the former Royal Greenwich Observatory, Herstmonceux. The INT dome is the single dome to the right

The United States gifted a 98-inch mirror in 1949 to the United Kingdom. (In a telescope this could establish the 3rd largest in the World, behind only the Hale and Hooker telescopes at that time). After ten years the mount was ordered for the telescope, and in 1959 construction began on what would be the INT, and it was completed by 1965; first light at Herstmonceux was conducted that year.

The mirror was ground by Grubb in the 1950s, although until 1956, according to Observatories and Telescopes of Modern Times, there was some consideration for buying a new 74-inch from Grubb. The Royal Greenwich Observatory completed its move to Herstmonceux in 1956.

A short film was published in 1956 that featured the grinding of the 98-inch mirror blank for the Isaac Newton Telescope by Grubb Parsons. (reflecting telescopes of this type need the glass blank ground into a precise shape, which can take years).

The telescope's first light (first, first light) occurred in 1965, and it was dedicated in 1967.

On December 1, 1967, the Isaac Newton Telescope of the Royal Greenwich Observatory at Herstmonceux was inaugurated (dedicated) by Queen Elizabeth II. One of the accomplishments with the telescope was the observations of Cygnus X-1.

In the late 1960s, a concept was developed for a Northern Hemisphere Observatory, that culminated in the project for an international observatory in the Canary Islands; Mauna Kea in Hawaii was also considered for the location. Although the telescope was acquitting itself, the weather at the site less so. This eventually led to the plan to move the telescope to a new observatory, which would occur in the next decade and into the early 1980s.

The 'last light' for the original Isaac Newton Telescope was in May 1979. The new telescope for the island had so many new parts however, it was deemed possible in the mid-1980s to essentially fork the telescope design into two working telescopes with some rejuvenation. This would mean having another functioning telescope at Sussex; however, this project was terminated. One issue is that it would mean operating two telescopes, and the focus at that time had shifted to operating the new INT on the island. The old site would eventually be turned into a science museum with much of the old telescopes left as they were.

The old observatory buildings remain by the Castle, and it is the site of the Herstmonceux Science Centre (aka Observatory Science Centre at Herstmonceux).

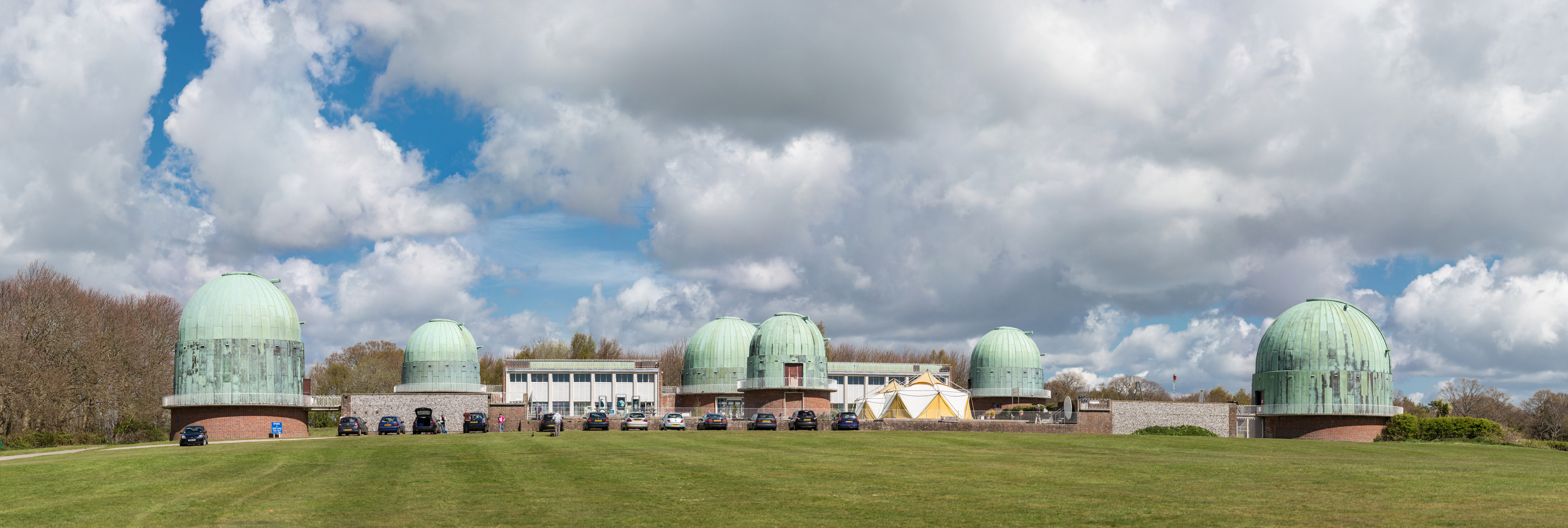
The former Royal Greenwich Observatory at Herstmonceux, the first light for the 98-inch mirror version of the INT

== Technical detail since 1984 ==
The La Palma INT is a Cassegrain telescope, with a 2.54 m (100 in) diameter primary mirror and a focal length of 8.36 m (329 in). The mirror weighs 4361 kg (9614 lb), and is supported by a polar disc/fork type equatorial mounting. The total weight of the telescope is around 90 tons. The f/3.29 Prime focus, used with the WFC, allows an unvignetted field of view of 40 arcminutes (approximately 0.3 square degrees). There is also a secondary focal station, the f/15 Cassegrain focus, which possesses a 20 arcminute field of view and is the mount point for the IDS. The telescope's second first light was done by video.

The new 100 inch Zerodur-glass mirror arrived at La Palma in December 1982.

The pointing accuracy of the telescope is around 5 arcseconds, but a sophisticated autoguider, which tracks a given guide star and makes small corrections to the telescope tracking, allows a guiding accuracy of better than an arcsecond on better than 20th magnitude guide stars in support of the typical 0.8–1.5 arcsec seeing at the INT.

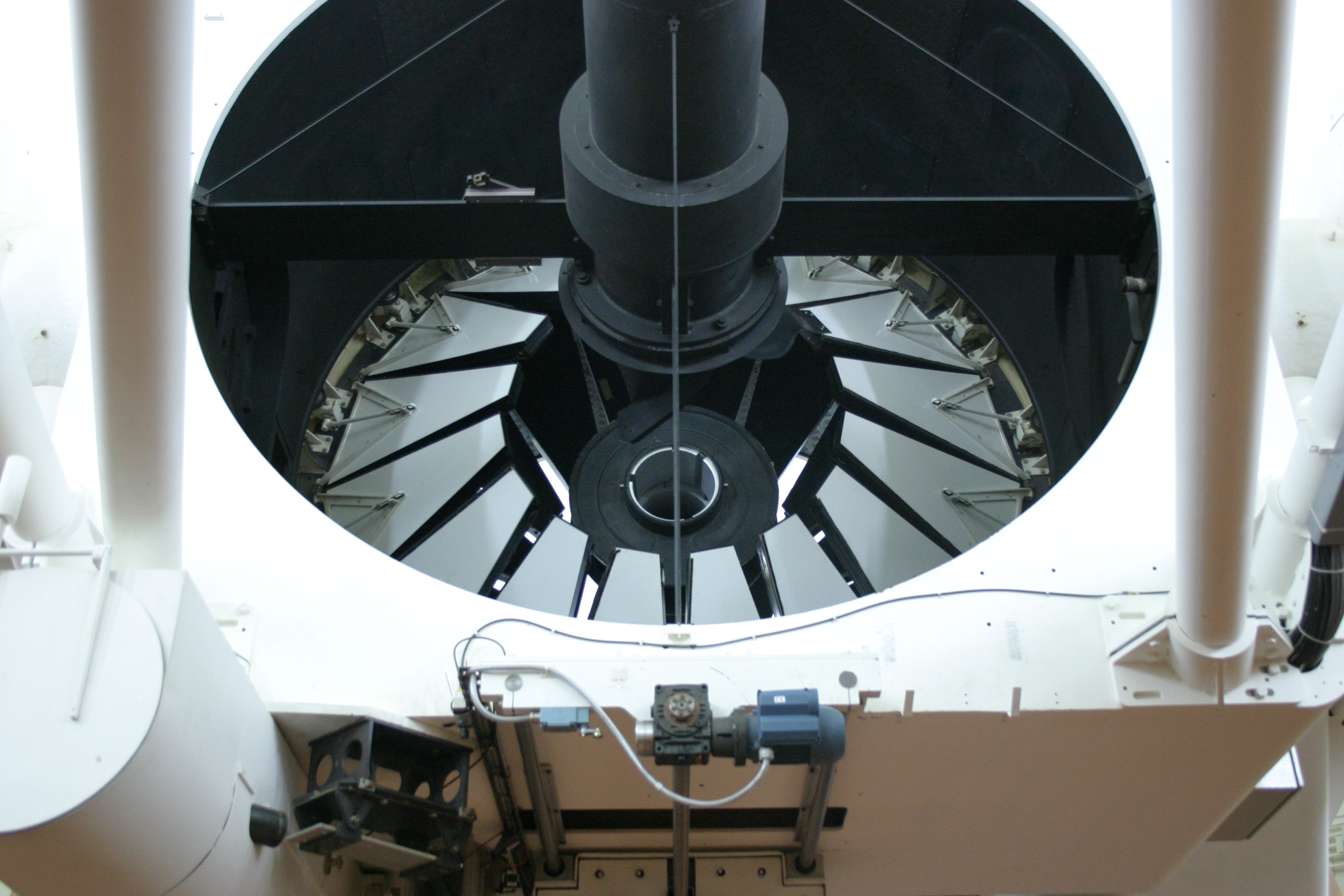
Isaac Newton Telescope Mirror, with the primary mirror cover petals almost closed.

== Contemporaries ==
The Isaac Newton Telescope was a very large telescope for its day, and the largest in England. It was a little smaller in aperture than the 100-inch Hooker telescope in the United States, but much newer. It originally had a 98-inch mirror when in England, but was given a new, larger 100-inch mirror by Grubb Parsons after the move.

=== 1967 ===
The INT was inaugurated by Queen Elizabeth II in 1967. The largest optical telescopes in 1967 included:

#	Name / Observatory	Image	Aperture	Altitude	First Light
1	5m Hale Telescope; Palomar Obs.		200″ 508 cm	1713 m (5620 ft)	1949
2	C. Donald Shane telescope Lick Observatory		120″ 305 cm	1283 m (4209 ft)	1959
3	Shajn 2.6m (Crimean 102 in.); Crimean Astrophysical Obs.		102″ 260 cm	600 m (1969 ft)	1961
4	Hooker Telescope; Mount Wilson Obs.		100″ 254 cm	1742 m (5715 ft)	1917
5	Isaac Newton Telescope; Royal Greenwich Obs. (1967-1979)		98″ 249 cm		1965
6	KPNO 2.1 m Telescope; Kitt Peak National Obs.		83″ 211 cm	2,070 m 6791 ft	1964
7	Otto Struve Telescope; McDonald Obs.		82″ 208 cm	2070 m (6791 ft)	1939

=== 1984 ===
INT began its new life atop the Spanish island of La Palma in the Canary Islands in 1984, with a new mirror and dome. Large visible-light optical ground telescopes in 1984 included:

	Name / Observatory	Image	Aperture	M1 Area	Altitude	First Light
n	BTA-6; Special Astrophysical Obs		238″ 605 cm	26 m^{2}	2070 m (6791 ft)	1975
n	Hale Telescope; Palomar Obs.		200″ 508 cm	20 m^{2}	1713 m (5620 ft)	1949
n	Multiple Mirror Telescope; Fred Lawrence Whipple Obs.		1.8 m x 6; 6+ or 4.7 m	m^{2}	2617 m (8585 ft)	1979
n	Mayall Telescope; Kitt Peak National Obs.		158″ 401 cm	10 m^{2}	2120 m (6955 ft)	1973
s	CTIO 4m/Blanco; CTIO Obs.		158″ 401 cm	10 m^{2}	2200 m (7217 ft)	1976
s	Anglo-Australian Telescope; Siding Spring Obs.		153″ 389 cm	m^{2}	1742 m (5715 ft)	1974
n	CFH telescope Mauna Kea Obs.		141″ 358 cm	m^{2}	4205 m (13,800 ft)	1979
s	ESO 3.6 m Telescope; ESO La Silla Obs.		140″ 357 cm	8.8 m^{2}	2400 m (7874 ft)	1977
n	MPI-CAHA 3.5m Calar Alto Obs.		138″ 350 cm	9 m^{2}	2168 m (7,113 ft)	1984
n	Shane Telescope; Lick Observatory		120″ 305 cm	m^{2}	1283 m (4209 ft)	1959
n	Harlan J. Smith Telescope; McDonald Observatory		107″ 270 cm		2070 m (6791 ft)	1968
n	Shajn 2.6m (Crimean 102 in.); Crimean Astrophysical Obs.		102″ 260 cm		600 m (1969 ft)	1961
n	BAO 2.6 telescope Byurakan Astrophysical Obs.		102″ 260 cm		1500 m (5000 ft)	1976
n	Isaac Newton Telescope; ORM Obs. (1980–Present)		100″ 254 cm		2396 m (7,860 ft)	1984
s	du Pont telescope Las Campanas Obs.		100″ 254 cm		2380 m (7841 ft)	1976
n	Hooker Telescope; Mount Wilson Obs.		100″ 254 cm		1742 m (5715 ft)	1917

== HARPS3 ==
The High Accuracy Radial velocity Planet Searcher 3 (HARPS3) is a high resolution Echelle-type spectrograph that will be installed onto the telescope and aims to start observations in March 2025. It is being built as part of the Terra Hunting Experiment - a future 10 year radial velocity measurement program to discover Earth-like exoplanets. It has a goal to achieve 10 cm/s radial velocity precision.

== See also ==
- Isaac Newton
- Newton's reflector (a reflector made by Isaac Newton in the 1600s)
- Newtonian telescope (a telescope design)
- International Year of Astronomy commemorative coin
- The INT Photometric H-Alpha Survey (IPHAS), an astronomical survey of the northern plane of the Milky Way Galaxy by this telescope
