= Víctor M. Blanco Telescope =

Telescope located in Chile

- Víctor M. Blanco 4-meter Telescope appears under the Milky Way at Cerro Tololo Inter-American Observatory.
- Alternative names: Cerro Tololo 160" Telescope (prior to 1995)
- Location: Chile
- Coordinates: 30°10′11″S 70°48′24″W
- Altitude: 2,207 m (7,241 ft)
- Diameter: 4,022.9 mm (13 ft 2.38 in)
- Collecting area: 10.014 m^{2} (107.79 sq ft)
- Website: noirlab.edu/public/programs/ctio/victor-blanco-4m-telescope/
- Location within Chile
- Related media on Commons

The Víctor M. Blanco Telescope, also known as the Blanco 4m, is a 4-metre aperture telescope located at the Cerro Tololo Inter-American Observatory, Chile on the summit of Mt. Cerro Tololo. Commissioned in 1974 and completed in 1976, the telescope is identical to the Mayall 4m telescope located on Kitt Peak. In 1995 it was dedicated and named in honour of Puerto Rican astronomer Víctor Manuel Blanco. It was the largest optical telescope in the Southern Hemisphere from 1976 until 1998, when the first 8-metre telescope of the ESO Very Large Telescope opened.

Currently the main research instrument used at the telescope is the Dark Energy Camera (DECam), the camera used in the Dark Energy Survey. DECam saw its first light in September 2012.

The Mosaic II camera was used at this CTIO 4-m telescope in the southern hemisphere since 1999. This was a development of the KNPO Mosaic camera installed in 1998 in the northern hemisphere. These cameras were used for various astronomical surveys, and were noted for their success.

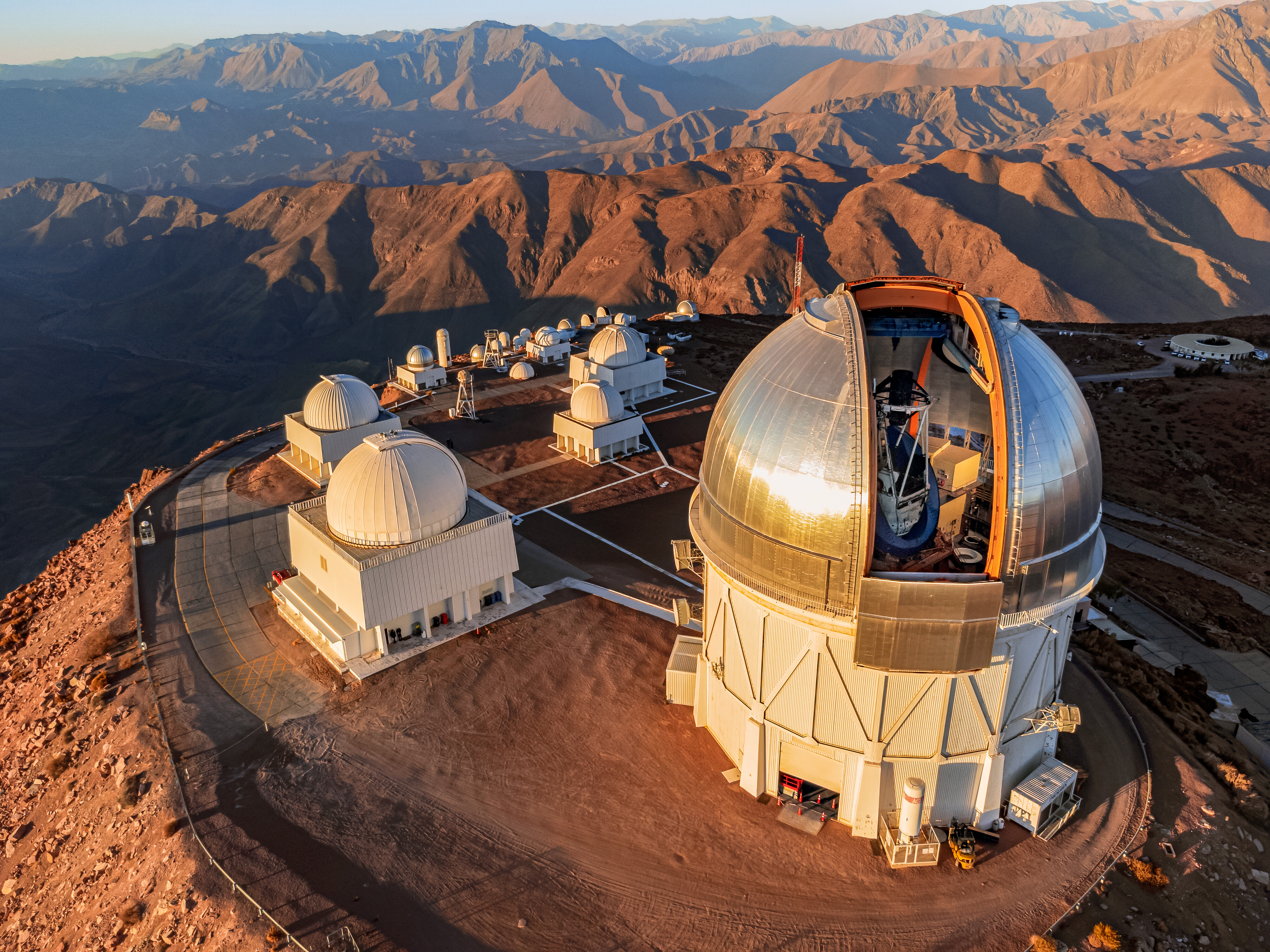
the Víctor M. Blanco 4-meter telescope on the summit of Mt. Cerro Tololo (foreground) with many other NOIRLab-operated telescopes

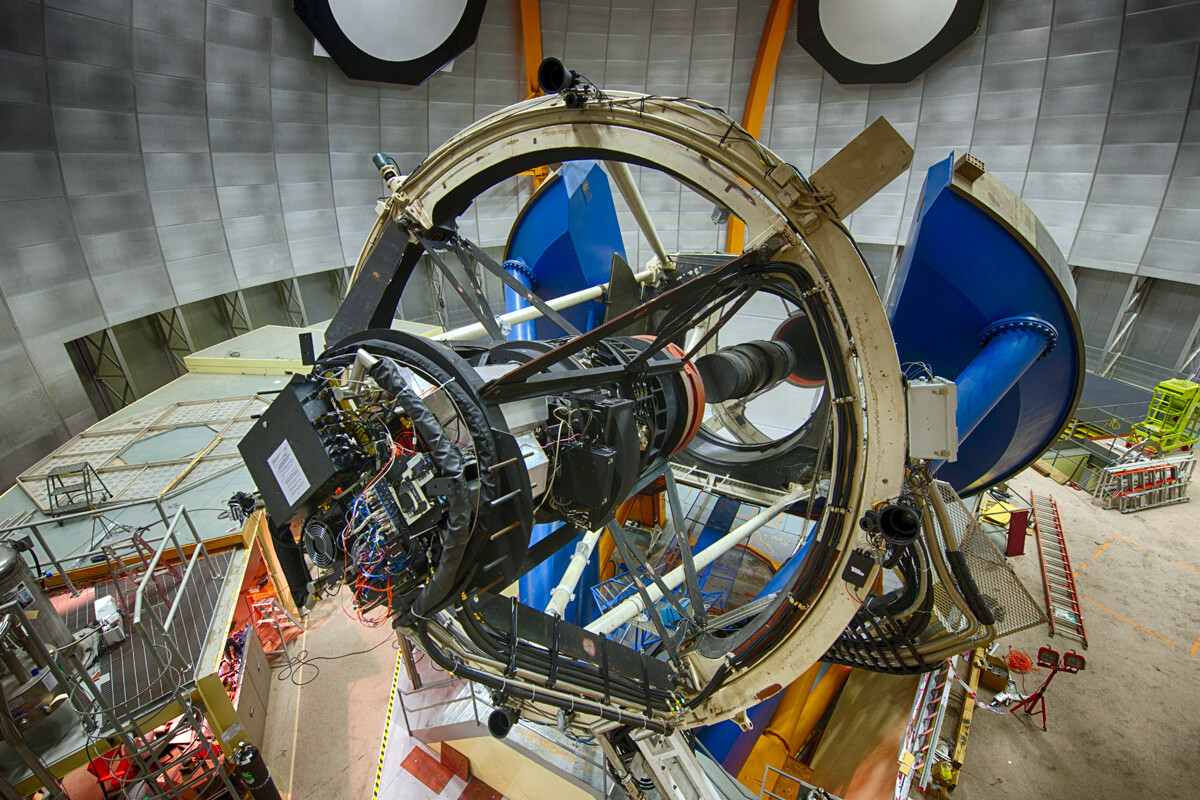
Víctor M. Blanco Telescope inside its dome with DECam mounted at its focus

Largest optical astronomical telescopes in 1976
#	Name / Observatory	Image	Aperture	M1 Area	Altitude	First Light	Special advocate
1.	BTA-6 (Special Astrophysical Obs)		238 inch 605 cm	26 m^{2}	2,070 m (6,790 ft)	1975	Mstislav Keldysh
2.	Hale Telescope (Palomar Observatory)		200 inch 508 cm	20 m^{2}	1,713 m (5,620 ft)	1949	George Ellery Hale
3.	Mayall Telescope (Kitt Peak National Obs.)		158 inch 401 cm	10 m^{2}	2,120 m (6,960 ft)	1973	Nicholas Mayall
4.	Víctor M. Blanco Telescope (CTIO Observatory)		158 inch 401 cm	10 m^{2}	2,200 m (7,200 ft)	1976	Nicholas Mayall
5.	Anglo-Australian Telescope (Siding Spring Observatory)		153 inch 389 cm	12 m^{2}	1,742 m (5,715 ft)	1974	Prince Charles
6.	ESO 3.6 m Telescope (La Silla Observatory)		140 inch 357 cm	8.8 m^{2}	2,400 m (7,900 ft)	1976	Adriaan Blaauw
7.	Shane Telescope (Lick Observatory)		120 inch 305 cm	~7 m^{2}	1,283 m (4,209 ft)	1959	Nicholas Mayall

== See also ==
- List of largest optical reflecting telescopes
- List of astronomical observatories
- List of largest optical telescopes in the 20th century
