= RATAN-600 =

Radio telescope at the Special Astrophysical Observatory in southern Russia

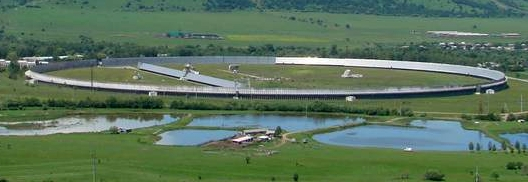
- View of the observatory from a neighboring hill
- Alternative names: Academy of Sciences Radio Telescope – 600
- Location(s): Russia
- Coordinates: 43°49′33″N 41°35′11″E
- Altitude: 970 m (3,180 ft)
- Wavelength: 1.38, 2.70, 3.90, 7.6, 13, 31.1 cm (21.72, 11.10, 7.69, 3.94, 2.31, 0.96 GHz)
- Built: 1968–1977
- First light: 12 July 1974
- Telescope style: radio telescope
- Diameter: 576 m (1,889 ft 9 in)
- Collecting area: 12,000 m^{2} (130,000 sq ft)
- Website: www.sao.ru/ratan/
- Location of RATAN-600
- Related media on Commons

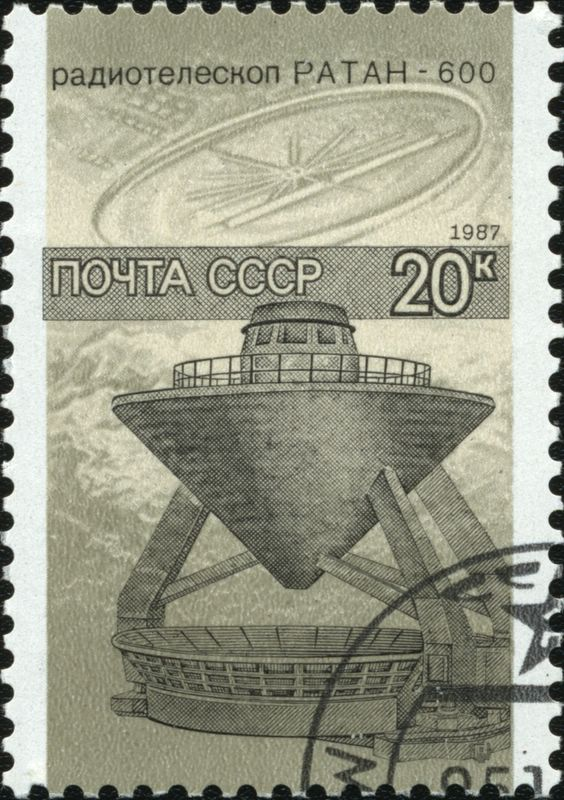
One of the conical secondary reflectors of the RATAN-600 on a 1987 USSR postal stamp

The RATAN-600 (Russian: РАТАН-600 – радиоастрономический телескоп Академии наук – 600, an acronym for the "Academy of Sciences Radio Telescope – 600") is a radio telescope in Zelenchukskaya, Karachay–Cherkess Republic, Russia. It comprises a 576 m diameter circle of rectangular radio reflectors and a set of secondary reflectors and receivers, based at an altitude of 970 m. Each of the 895 2 m × 7.4 m reflectors can be angled to reflect incoming radio waves towards a central conical secondary mirror, or to one of five parabolic cylinders. Each secondary reflector is combined with an instrumentation cabin containing various receivers and instruments. The overall effect is that of a partially steerable antenna with a maximum resolving power of a nearly 600 m diameter dish, when using the central conical receiver, making it the world's largest-diameter individual radio telescope. It began operation in 1977.

== Operating modes ==
The telescope can operate in three modes:

- Two-mirror system: A sector of the ring focuses waves to the cylindrical secondary mirror which directs them onto the receivers.
- Three-mirror system: The linear plane mirror reflects the waves to the south sector of the ring, which focuses them on a cylindrical secondary, that reflects them onto the receivers. This is a Kraus-type periscope mirror system.
- Entire ring: For observations near the zenith, the entire ring can be used, together with the conical secondary mirror and its receivers.

Simultaneous independent observations at various discrete azimuths are possible. For this, a sector of the ring is coupled with one of the secondary mirror-and-receiver units, which can be positioned using railway tracks, while another sector, in conjunction with another secondary mirror, is similarly used for an independent observation.

== Optical specifications ==
It has a resolving power in the horizontal plane of 1 arcminute at a wavelength of 8 cm (3.75 GHz). The effective collecting area of the entire ring is 1,000 square metres (11,000 sq ft) which is 0.33% of that expected of a completely filled reflector of this size.

== Transit telescope ==
Comparison of the Arecibo (top), FAST (middle) and RATAN-600 (bottom) radio telescopes at the same scale

The RATAN-600 is primarily operated as a transit telescope, in which the rotation of the Earth is used to sweep the telescope focus across the subject of observation. Radio frequency observations can be made in the 610 MHz to 30 GHz frequency band, though primarily in the centimeter waveband, with an angular resolution of up to 2 arcseconds. Observation of the Sun at radio wavelengths, in particular of the solar corona, has been a long-standing focus of the RATAN-600's scientific programme. It has also contributed to radio observation for the SETI project. The RATAN-600 has not suffered from the persistent technical problems of the neighbouring BTA-6, and has generally been in high demand since it began operation in mid-1974.

== SETI candidate signal ==
On 15 May 2015, at 18:01:15.65 sidereal time, RATAN-600 detected a strong (0.75 Jansky) signal from the direction of HD164595. More specifically, the signal intensity rose and fell as the telescope panned past in a way that closely matched what would be expected for a distant source. Since the short wavelength (2.7 cm, or 11 GHz, in the X band) is unusual for a natural source of that power, after the researchers announced the signal in late August 2016 (in the form of a request for follow-up observations) there was a flurry of excitement that it might be a SETI candidate. Of course, the same artificial appearance also makes a terrestrial source likely. Because the signal is in a frequency band allocated to military use, it might have originated from a secret reconnaissance satellite. After further analysis, and a failure of other observatories to corroborate the signal, the Special Astrophysical Observatory concluded that it was of probably terrestrial origin.

Later research suggests that it might have been a faulty satellite in a slow spin, as the frequency matches one used for inter-satellite beacons, but was more likely to be the downlink from an intact but classified satellite.

== Gallery ==
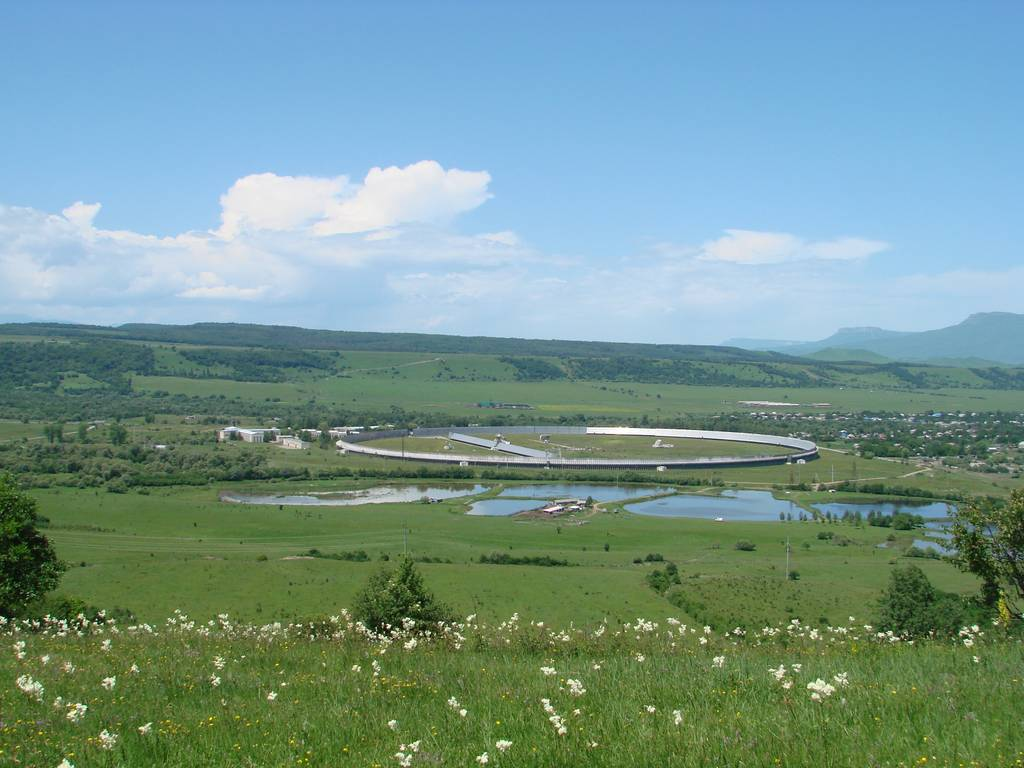
Photo of the RATAN-600 in its environment

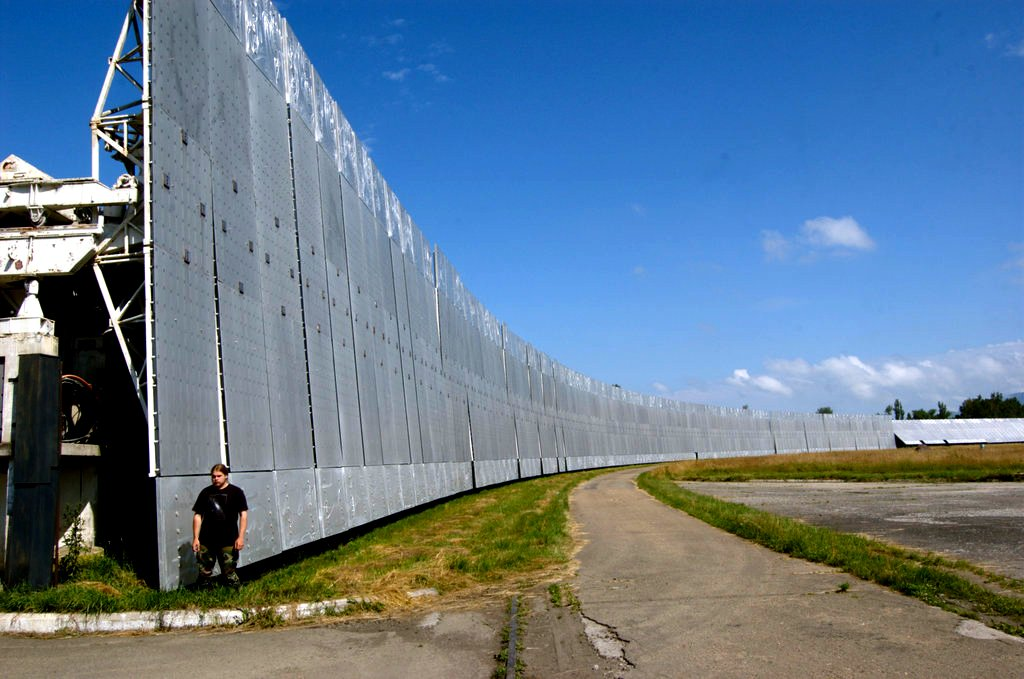
Reflector plates, measuring 11,4 m × 2,0 m

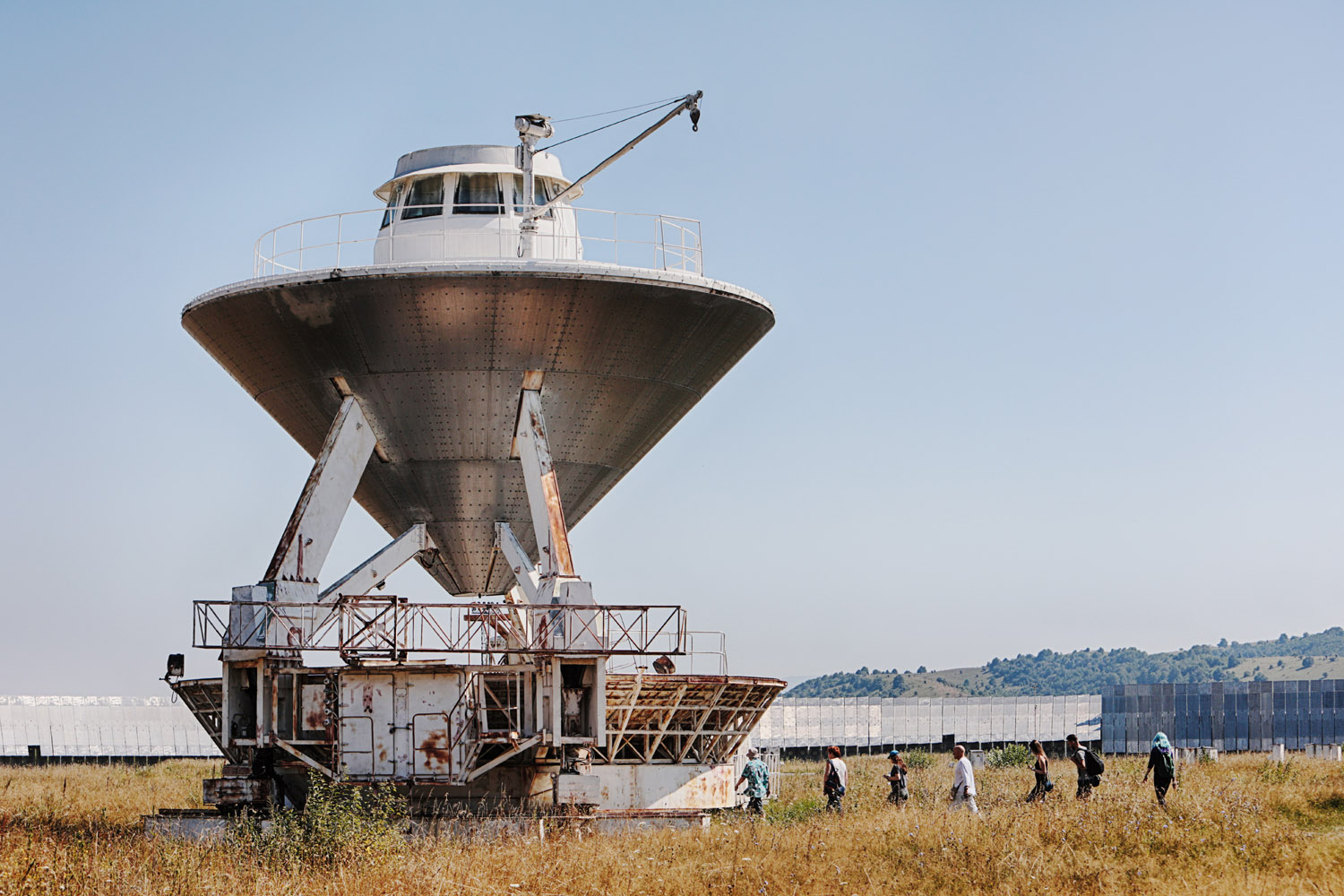
One of the conical secondary reflectors of the RATAN-600

== See also ==
- Radio astronomy
- Five-hundred-meter Aperture Spherical Telescope world's second-largest diameter individual radio telescope
