= Bagrat Ioannisiani =

Soviet Armenian engineer (1911–1985)

- Բագրատ Իոանիսյան
- Born: 23 October [O.S. 10 October] 1911; Yerevan, Armenia
- Died: December 10, 1985 (aged 74); Leningrad, Soviet Union
- Known for: Chief designer of the BTA-6 telescope
- Awards: Hero of Socialist Labor (1977), three Order of Lenin, Order of the Badge of Honour, Lenin Prize

Bagrat Konstantinovich Ioannisiani (born 23 October [O.S. 10 October] 1911 in Yerevan, Armenia, died 10 December 1985 in Leningrad, Soviet Union) was a Soviet telescope designer of Armenian descent.

He was the chief designer of the BTA-6, one of the largest telescopes in the world. He was awarded the Lenin Prize in 1957.
