= BTA-6 =

Optical telescope at the Special Astrophysical Observatory in southern Russia

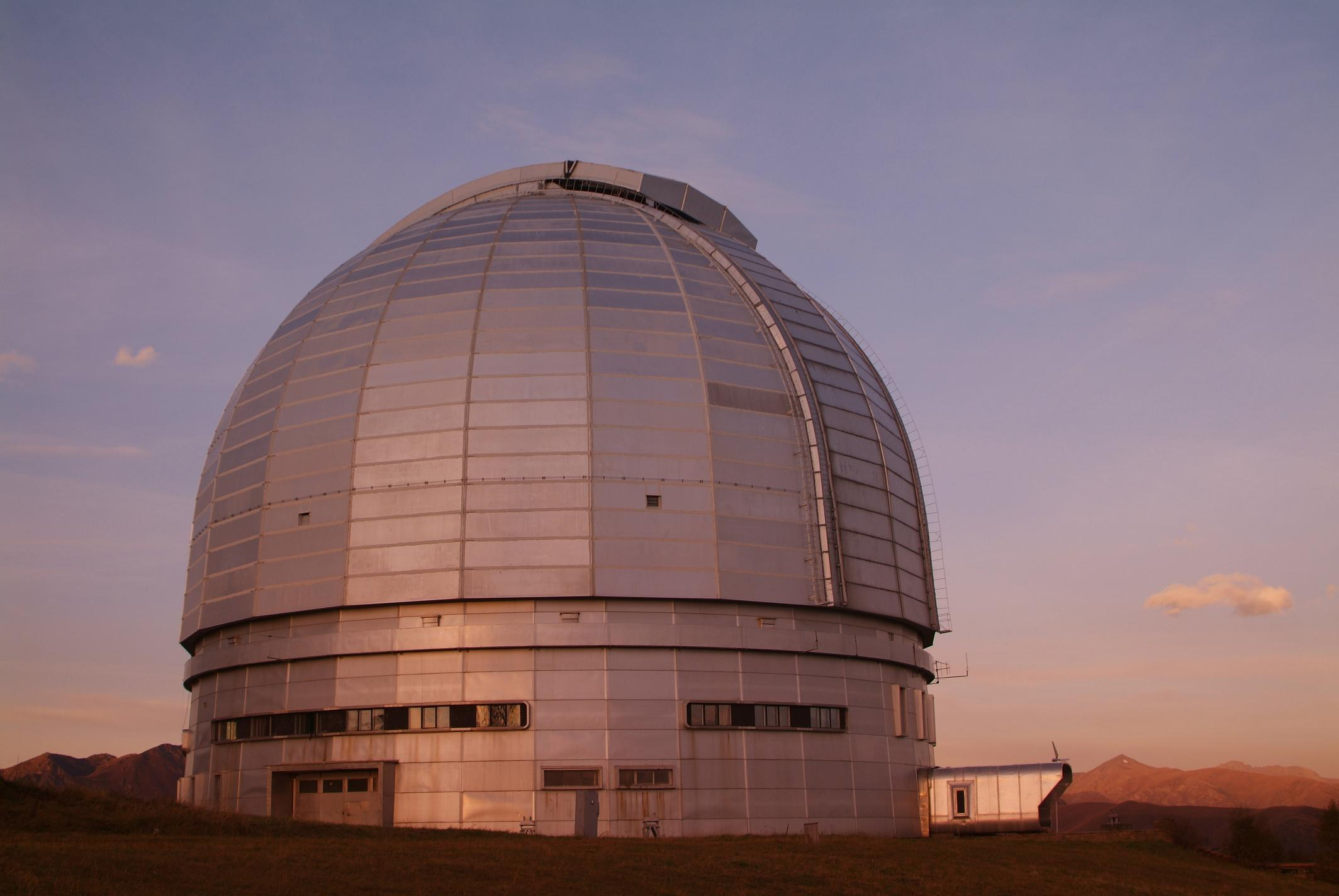
- Alternative names: Large Altazimuth Telescope
- Location(s): Caucasus Mountains
- Coordinates: 43°38′48″N 41°26′26″E
- Altitude: 2,070 m (6,790 ft)
- Wavelength: 0.3, 10 μm (999, 30 THz)
- Diameter: 605 cm (19 ft 10 in)
- Collecting area: 26 m^{2} (280 sq ft)
- Focal length: 24 m (78 ft 9 in)
- Website: www.sao.ru/Doc-en/Telescopes/bta/descrip.html
- Location of BTA-6

The BTA-6 (Russian: Большой Телескоп Альт-азимутальный, romanized: Bolshoi Teleskop Alt-azimutalnyi, lit. 'Large Altazimuth Telescope') is a 6-metre (20 ft) aperture optical telescope at the Special Astrophysical Observatory located in the Zelenchuksky District of Karachay-Cherkessia on the north side of the Caucasus Mountains in southern Russia.

The BTA-6 achieved first light in late 1975, making it the largest telescope in the world until 1990, when it was surpassed by the partially constructed Keck 1. It pioneered the technique, now standard in large astronomical telescopes, of using an altazimuth mount with a computer-controlled derotator.

For a variety of reasons, BTA-6 has never been able to operate near its theoretical limits. Early problems with poorly fabricated mirror glass were addressed in 1978, improving but not eliminating the most serious issue. But due to its location downwind of numerous large mountain peaks, astronomical seeing is rarely good. The telescope also suffers from serious thermal expansion problems due to the large thermal mass of the mirror, and the dome as a whole, which is much larger than necessary. Upgrades have taken place throughout the system's history and are ongoing to this day.

== History ==
=== Background ===
For many years the primary world-class observatory in the Soviet Union was the Pulkovo Observatory outside Saint Petersburg, originally built in 1839. Like many observatories of its era, it was primarily dedicated to timekeeping, weather, navigation and similar practical tasks, with a secondary role for scientific research. Around its 50th anniversary a new 76 cm (30 inch) telescope was installed for deep space observation. Further upgrades were limited due to a variety of factors, while a number of much larger instruments were built around the world over the next few decades.

In the 1950s the Soviet Academy of Sciences decided to build a new telescope that would allow first-rate deep space observation. Design work started at Pulkovo in 1959 under the leadership of future Lenin Prize winner Bagrat K. Ioannisiani. With the goal of building the largest telescope in the world, a title long held by the 200 inch (5 m) Hale Telescope at the Palomar Observatory, the team settled on a new design of 6 m (236 inches). This is about the maximum size a solid mirror can have without suffering from major distortion when tilted.

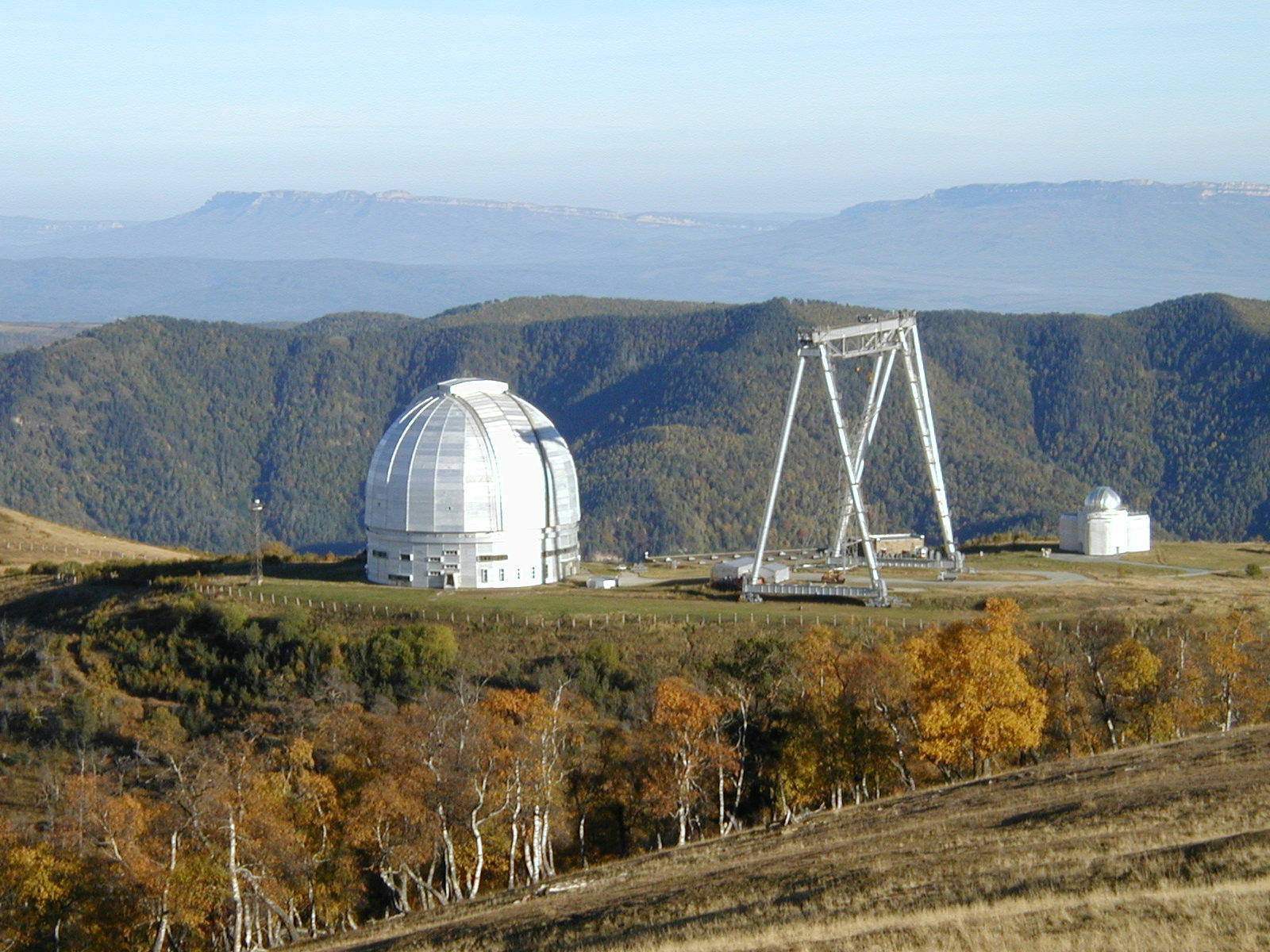
The telescope's building, with a special crane on the right used for maintenance. A Zeiss 1-m telescope is housed in the building on the right. A 60-cm telescope was added in 1994.

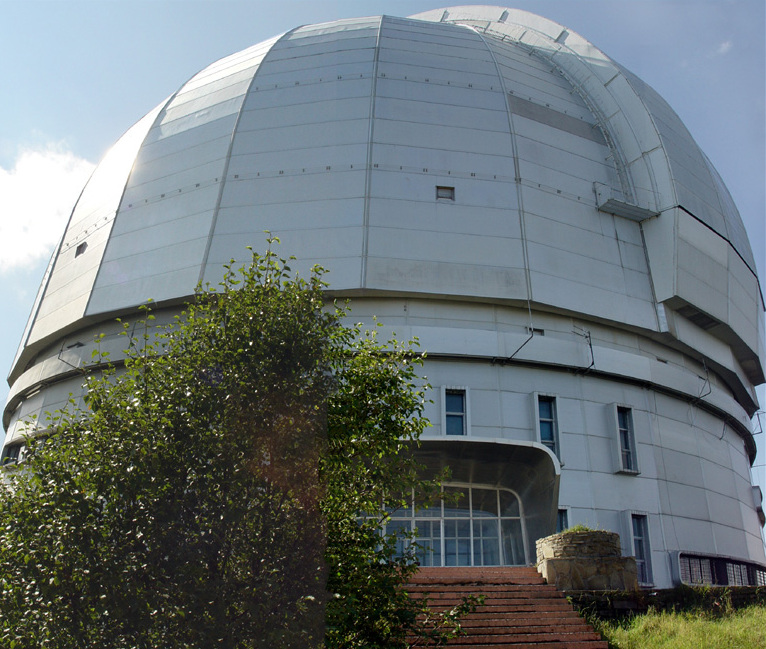
In front of the main entrance

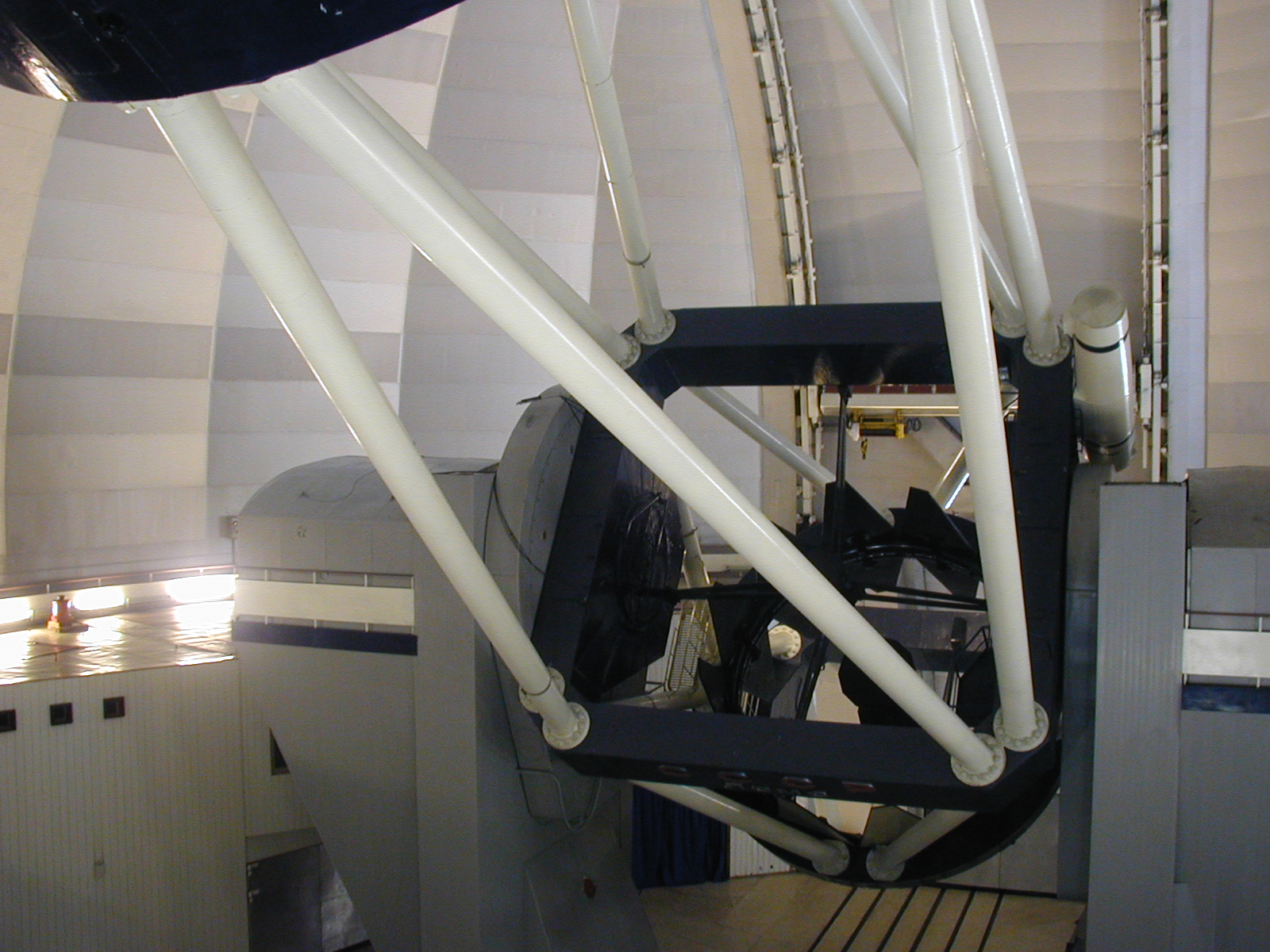
The telescope's 6 metre diameter main mirror is visible in the lower right part of the image.

A telescope's theoretical angular resolution is defined by its aperture, which in the case of the BTA's 6 m leads to a resolution of about 0.021 arcseconds. Atmospheric effects overwhelm this, so it becomes important to locate high-resolution instruments at high altitudes in order to avoid as much of the atmosphere as possible. The Pulkovo site, at 75 m above sea level, was simply not suitable for a high-quality instrument. While BTA was being designed another instrument, the RATAN-600 radio telescope, was also designed. It was decided that the two instruments should be co-located, allowing the construction of a single site to house the crews. To select the site, sixteen expeditions were dispatched to various regions of the USSR, and the final selection was in the North Caucasus Mountains near Zelenchukskaya at a height of 2,070 m. In 1966 the Special Astrophysical Observatory was formed to host the BTA-6 and RATAN-600.

=== Problems ===
The first attempt to fabricate the primary mirror was made by the Lytkarino Optical Glass Plant, near Moscow. They annealed the glass too quickly, causing cracks and bubbles to form, making the mirror useless. A second attempt fared better and was installed in 1975. BTA's first images were obtained on the night of 28/29 December 1975. After a break-in period, BTA was declared fully operational in January 1977.

However, it was clear the second mirror was only marginally better than the first, and contained major imperfections. Crews took to blocking off portions of the mirror using large pieces of black cloth to cover over the roughest areas. According to Ioannisiani, the primary directed only 61% of the incoming light into a 0.5-arcsecond circle and 91% into one with twice the diameter.

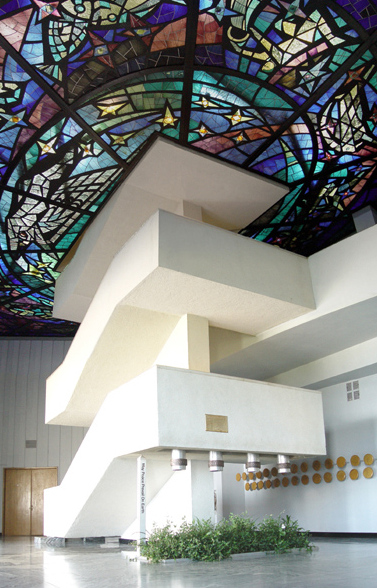
Inside the main observatory

Almost immediately after it opened, rumors started in the West that something was seriously wrong with the telescope. It was not long before many dismissed it as a white elephant, so much so that it was even discussed in James Oberg's 1988 book Uncovering Soviet Disasters.

A third mirror, with an improved figure and no cracks, was installed in 1978. Although this improved the major problems, a number of unrelated issues continued to seriously degrade the overall performance of the telescope. In particular, the site is downwind of a number of other peaks in the Caucasus, so the site's astronomical seeing is rarely better than one arcsecond resolution, and anything under 2 arcseconds is considered good. In comparison, most major astronomical sites average seeing under one arcsecond. Under favourable conditions the width of the seeing disc (FWHM) is ≈1 arcsecond for 20% of observational nights. Weather is another significant factor; on average, observing takes place on fewer than half of the nights throughout the year.

Perhaps the most annoying problem is the huge thermal mass of the primary mirror, the telescope as a whole, and the enormous dome. Thermal effects are so significant in the primary that it can tolerate only a 2 °C change per day and still retain a usable figure. If the temperatures of the primary and the outside air differ by even 10 degrees, observations become impossible. The large size of the dome itself means there are thermal gradients within it that compound these problems. Refrigeration within the dome offsets some of these issues.

Speckle interferometry techniques today allow the diffraction-limited resolution of 0.02 arcseconds of 15th magnitude objects under good seeing conditions (EMCCD-based speckle interferometer – PhotonMAX-512B camera – in active use since 2007). "In contrast to the adaptive optics, which is effective today mainly in the infrared, speckle interferometry can be used for observations in visible and near UV bands. In addition, speckle interferometry is realizable under poor atmospheric conditions, while the adaptive optics always needs the best seeing".

=== Improvements ===
SAO astronomers planned to address one of the main problems with a new mirror made of the ultra-low expansion glass-ceramic Sitall, but this upgrade is not recorded as having taken place. With a Sitall primary mirror it would be possible to reduce the thickness from 65 to 40 cm, reducing thermal inertia.

By 2007 the operational mirror, the third to be produced, had become heavily corroded by the use of nitric acid to neutralise the alkali-based solvents used to clean the glass before applying a new layer of reflective aluminium. A major overhaul in order to re-grind the mirror was needed, but this would have cut into the packed observing schedule. Instead, the second mirror, abandoned due to imperfections but sitting in storage throughout, was returned to Lytkarino for refurbishment. In 2012 a milling machine removed 8 mm of glass from the upper surface, taking with that all of the optical imperfections. Work was supposed to be finished in 2013, but was delayed due to funding shortage. The mirror was finally completed in November 2017, and mirror replacement took place in May 2018. However, the refurbished mirror was found to be still inadequate, and after a few months of testing, it was decided to replace it with the previous mirror.

== Description ==
The BTA primary is a 605 cm f/4 mirror. This is a relatively slow primary compared to similar instruments; the Hale is a 5 m f/3.3. The telescope optics are a Cassegrain design, albeit without the traditional Cassegrain-style focus. Due to its large primary, the image scale at the prime focus is 8.6 arc seconds per millimeter, about the same as the Cassegrainian focus of a 4 m telescope.

When working at the prime focus, a Ross coma corrector is used. The field of view, with coma and astigmatism corrected at a level of less than 0.5 arcseconds, is about 14 arcminutes. It takes about three to four minutes to switch from one focus to another, making it possible to use several different instrument sets in a short period of time.

BTA-6 is enclosed in a massive dome, 53 m tall at the peak, and 48 m tall from the cylindrical base it sits on. The dome is much larger than required, and there is a gap of 12 m between the telescope and dome.

== Comparison ==
Largest optical astronomical telescopes in the late 1970s
#	Name / observatory	Image	Aperture	M1 area	Altitude	First light	Special advocate
1.	BTA-6 (Special Astrophysical Obs)		238 inch 605 cm	28 m^{2}	2,070 m (6,790 ft)	1975	Mstislav Keldysh
2.	Hale Telescope (Palomar Observatory)		200 inch 508 cm	20 m^{2}	1,713 m (5,620 ft)	1949	George Ellery Hale
3.	Mayall Telescope (Kitt Peak National Obs.)		158 inch 401 cm	13 m^{2}	2,120 m (6,960 ft)	1973	Nicholas Mayall
4.	Víctor M. Blanco Telescope (CTIO Observatory)		158 inch 401 cm	13 m^{2}	2,200 m (7,200 ft)	1976	Nicholas Mayall
5.	Anglo-Australian Telescope (Siding Spring Observatory)		153 inch 389 cm	12 m^{2}	1,742 m (5,715 ft)	1974	Prince Charles
6.	ESO 3.6 m Telescope (La Silla Observatory)		140 inch 357 cm	10 m^{2}	2,400 m (7,900 ft)	1976	Adriaan Blaauw
7.	Shane Telescope (Lick Observatory)		120 inch 305 cm	~7 m^{2}	1,283 m (4,209 ft)	1959	Nicholas Mayall

Graphic

Comparison of nominal sizes of apertures of the BTA-6 and some notable optical telescopes

== See also ==
- List of largest optical reflecting telescopes
- List of largest optical telescopes historically
