= ESO 3.6 m Telescope =

Optical reflecting telescope in Chile

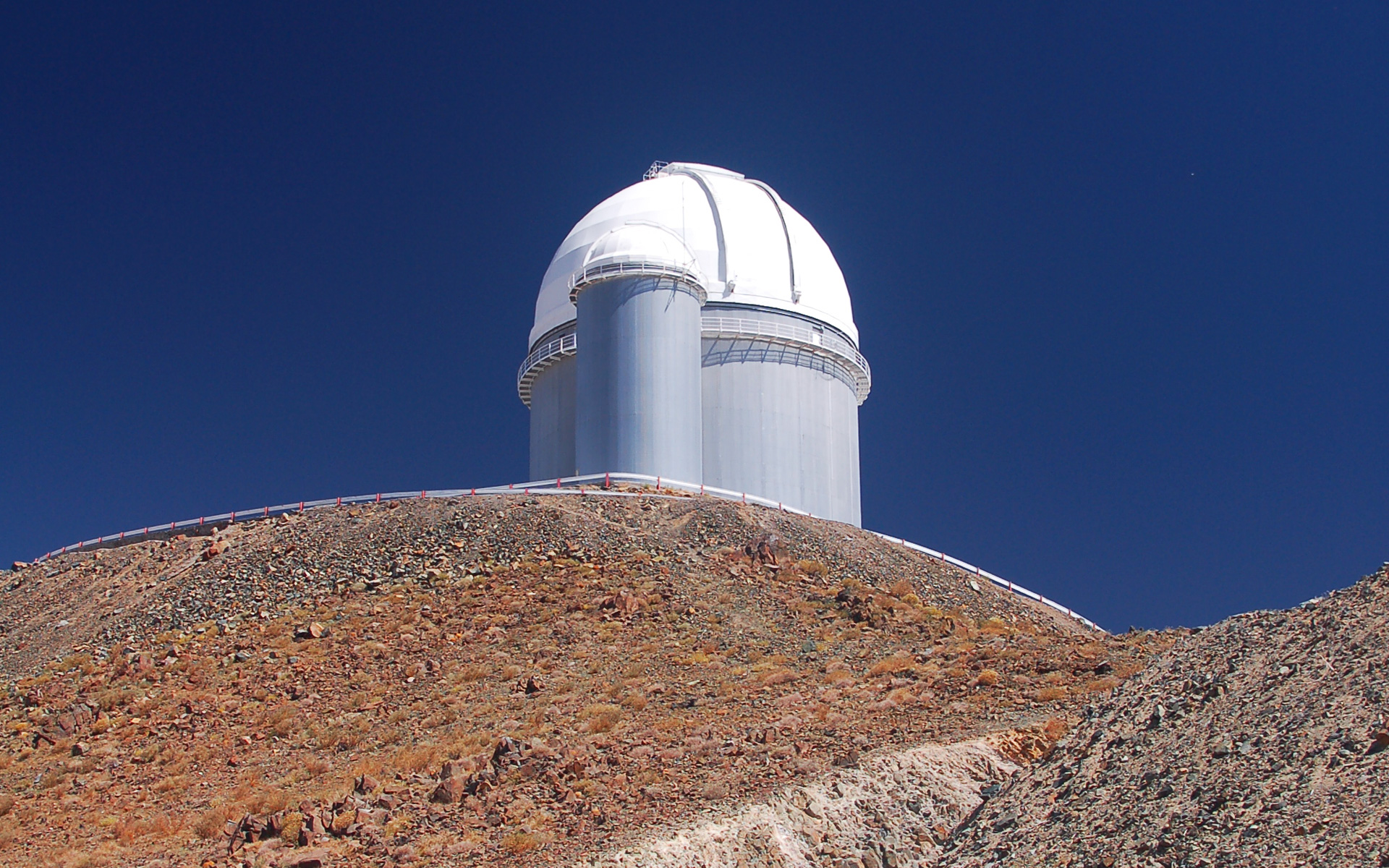
- The ESO 3.6 m telescope with the Coudé Auxiliary 1.47-m Telescope (CAT)
- Alternative names: The ESO 3.6m at La Silla
- Location: Chile
- Coordinates: 29°15′39″S 70°43′54″W
- Altitude: 2,400 m (7,900 ft)
- Diameter: 3.566 m (11 ft 8.4 in)
- Collecting area: 8.8564 m^{2} (95.329 sq ft)
- Website: www.eso.org/sci/facilities/lasilla/telescopes/3p6.html
- Location within Chile
- Related media on Commons

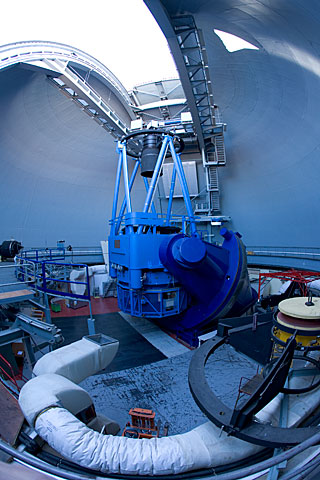
ESO 3.6 m Telescope

The ESO 3.6 m Telescope is an optical reflecting telescope run by the European Southern Observatory at La Silla Observatory, Chile since 1977, with a clear aperture of about 3.6 metres (140 in) and 8.6 m^{2} (93 sq ft) area.

The telescopes uses the HARPS instrument and has discovered more than 130 exoplanets. In 2012, it discovered Alpha Centauri Bb, a now-disproven possible planet in the Alpha Centauri system only 4.4 light-years away.

ESO collaborated with CERN on building the telescope. It saw first light in 1976 and entered full operations in 1977. When completed it was one of the world's largest optical telescopes. It received an overhaul in 1999 and a new secondary in 2004. The ESO 3.6-metre Telescope has supported many scientific achievements and presented ADONIS, one of the first adaptive optics system available to the astronomical community in the 1980s.

== Instruments ==
Since 2022, the ESO 3.6 m telescope has hosted HARPS, the High Accuracy Radial Velocity Planet Searcher and NIRPS, the Near Infra Red Planet Searcher. HARPS is a fibre-fed high resolution echelle spectrograph dedicated to the discovery of extrasolar planets. Other instruments on the telescope, now decommissioned, include:

- CES: is a spectrograph that provides a resolving power of up to 235,000 in the 346–1028 nm region.
- EFOSC2: the ESO Faint Object Spectrograph and Camera (v.2), is a very versatile instrument for low resolution spectroscopy and imaging.
- TIMMI-2: the Thermal Infrared MultiMode Instrument dedicated to the 3–25 μm spectrum.
- ADONIS: is the acronym for Adaptive Optics Near Infrared System, and was a second-generation adaptive optics system for the astronomical community. More than 40 peer-reviewed scientific articles were published based on this instrument data. ADONIS is the final version of diverse Adaptive Optics (AO) prototypes named Come-on and Come-on +. It was offered in its final version in October 1996 as an official ESO instrument, then decommissioned in 2001. ADONIS was the first AO system offered to a large community of astronomers.

== Recent scientific achievements ==
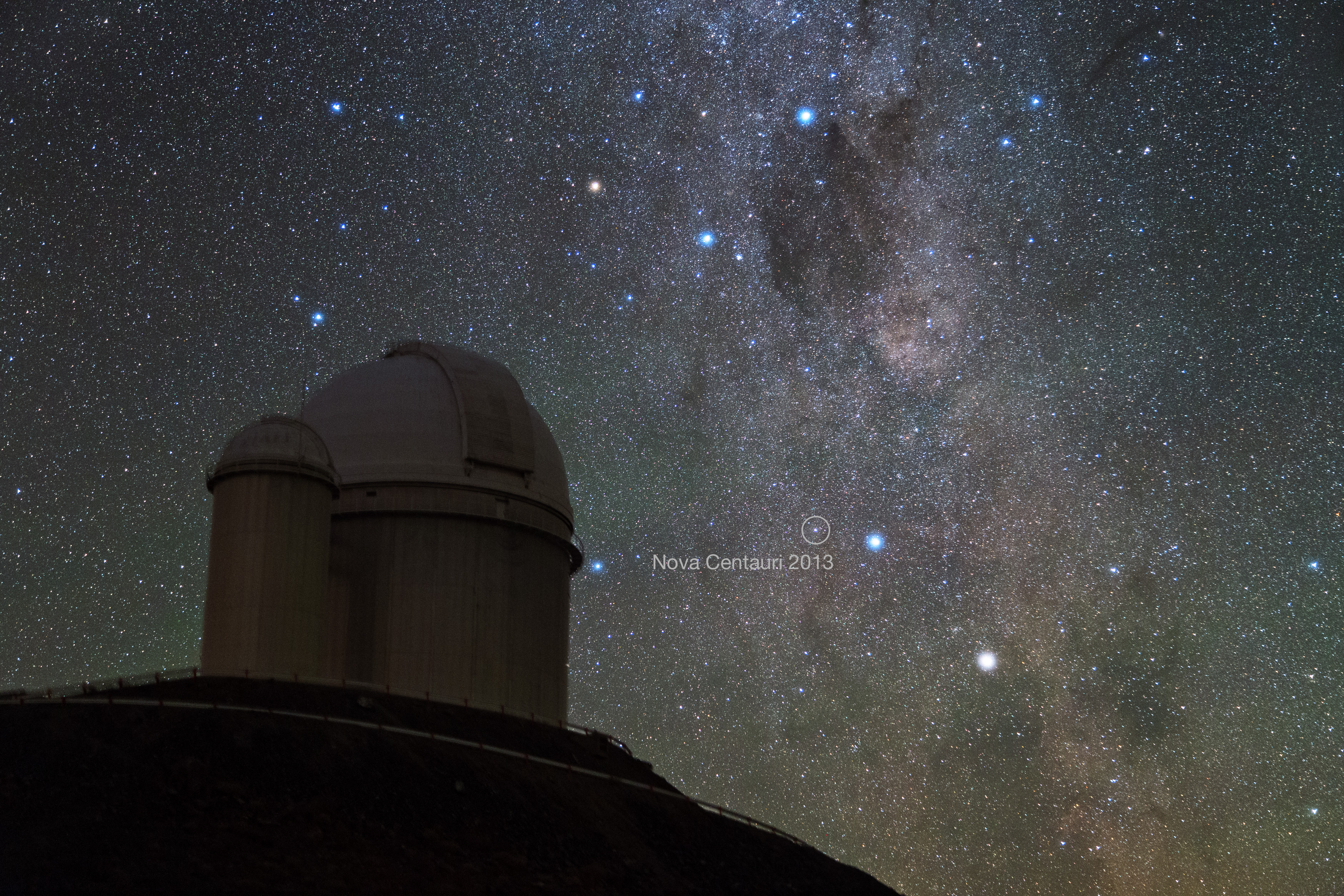
The ESO 3.6 backdropped by the southern sky, and annotated note for the recently discovered Nova Centauri 2013

The ESO 3.6 m telescope has made several scientific discoveries since it saw first light. Recent astronomical achievements were made possible by HARPS, a "top-class" instrument. This includes finding the lightest exoplanet known at the time of discovery in, Gliese 581e, with only twice the mass of the Earth, and the richest planetary system known at the time, with up to seven planets orbiting a Sun-like star.

The telescope was also involved in solving a decades-old mystery regarding the mass of Cepheid variable stars. By using the HARPS instrument, astronomers detected for the first time a double star where a pulsating Cepheid variable and another star pass in front of one another, which allows to measure the mass of the Cepheid. The study concluded that the mass prediction coming from the theory of stellar pulsation was correct while the value calculated was at odds with the theory of stellar evolution.

The discovery of the extrasolar planet Gliese 581 c by the team of Stéphane Udry at University of Geneva's Observatory in Switzerland was announced on April 24, 2007. The team used the telescope's HARPS spectrograph, and employed the radial velocity technique to identify the planet's influence on the star.

By 2009, the telescope was used to discover 75 exoplanet candidates. In 2011, another 50 exoplanet candidates were announced.

== Contemporaries on commissioning ==
Largest optical astronomical telescopes in 1976
#	Name (observatory)	Image	Aperture	M1 area	Altitude	First light	Special advocate
1.	BTA-6 (Special Astrophysical Obs)		238 inch 605 cm	26 m^{2}	2,070 m (6,790 ft)	1975	Mstislav Keldysh
2.	Hale Telescope (Palomar Observatory)		200 inch 508 cm	20 m^{2}	1,713 m (5,620 ft)	1949	George Ellery Hale
3.	Mayall Telescope (Kitt Peak National Obs.)		158 inch 401 cm	10 m^{2}	2,120 m (6,960 ft)	1973	Nicholas Mayall
4.	Víctor M. Blanco Telescope (CTIO Observatory)		158 inch 401 cm	10 m^{2}	2,200 m (7,200 ft)	1976	Nicholas Mayall
5.	Anglo-Australian Telescope (Siding Spring Observatory)		153 inch 389 cm	12 m^{2}	1,742 m (5,715 ft)	1974	Prince Charles
6.	ESO 3.6 m Telescope (La Silla Observatory)		140 inch 357 cm	8.8 m^{2}	2,400 m (7,900 ft)	1976	Adriaan Blaauw
7.	Shane Telescope (Lick Observatory)		120 inch 305 cm	~7 m^{2}	1,283 m (4,209 ft)	1959	Nicholas Mayall

== Gallery ==
=== Telescope and site ===
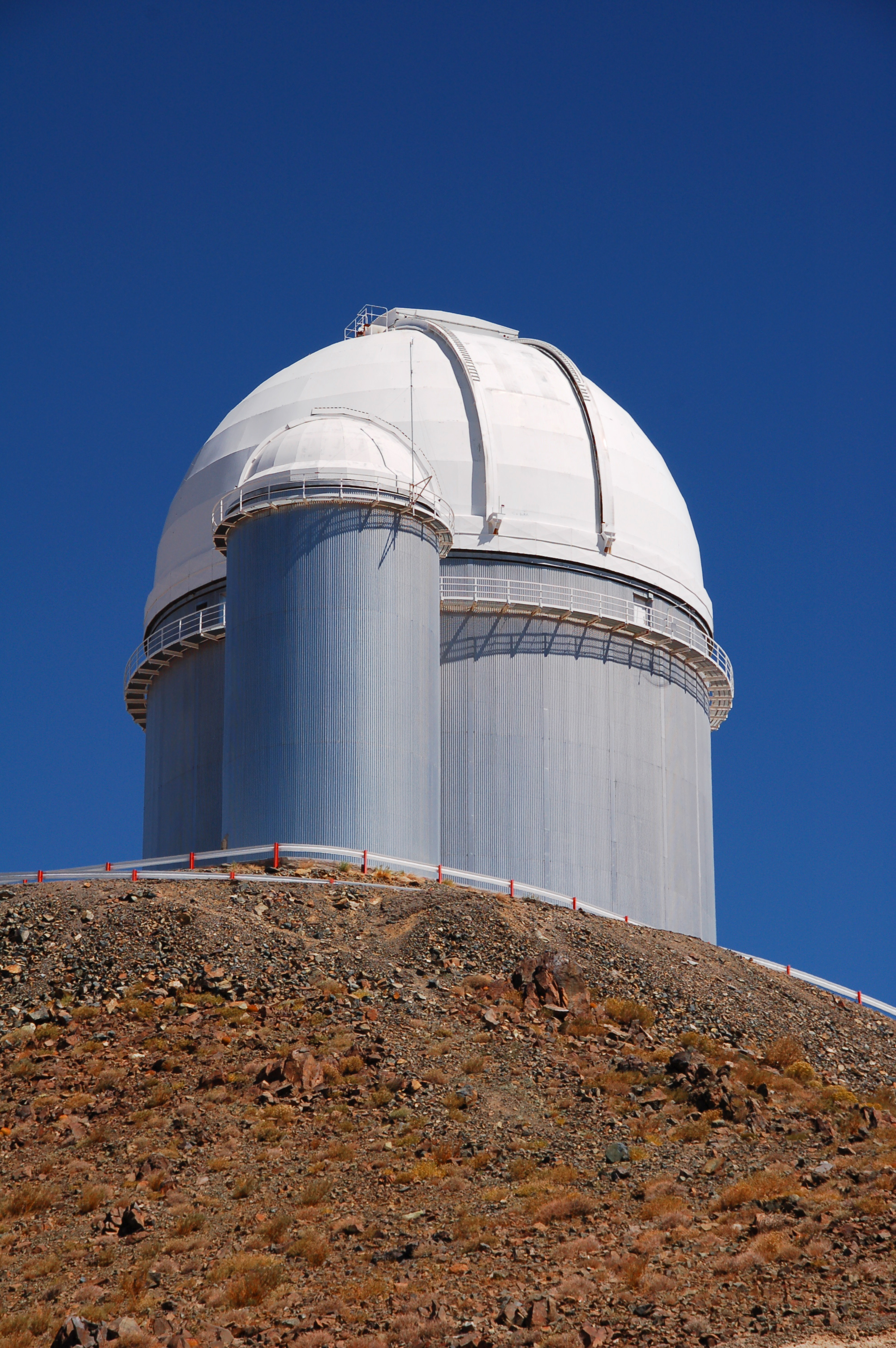
The ESO 3.6-metre telescope.

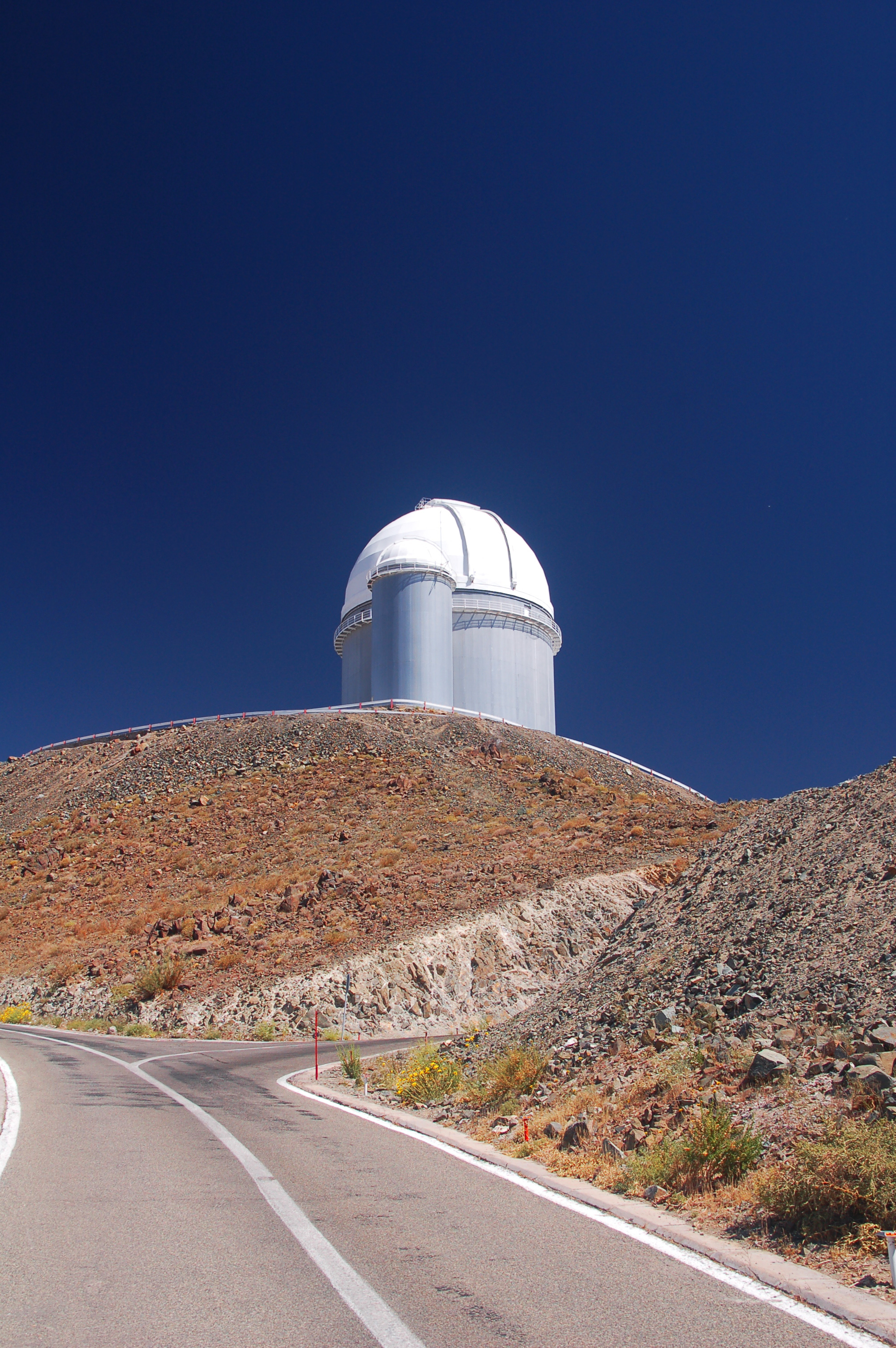
The road to the telescope at La Silla.

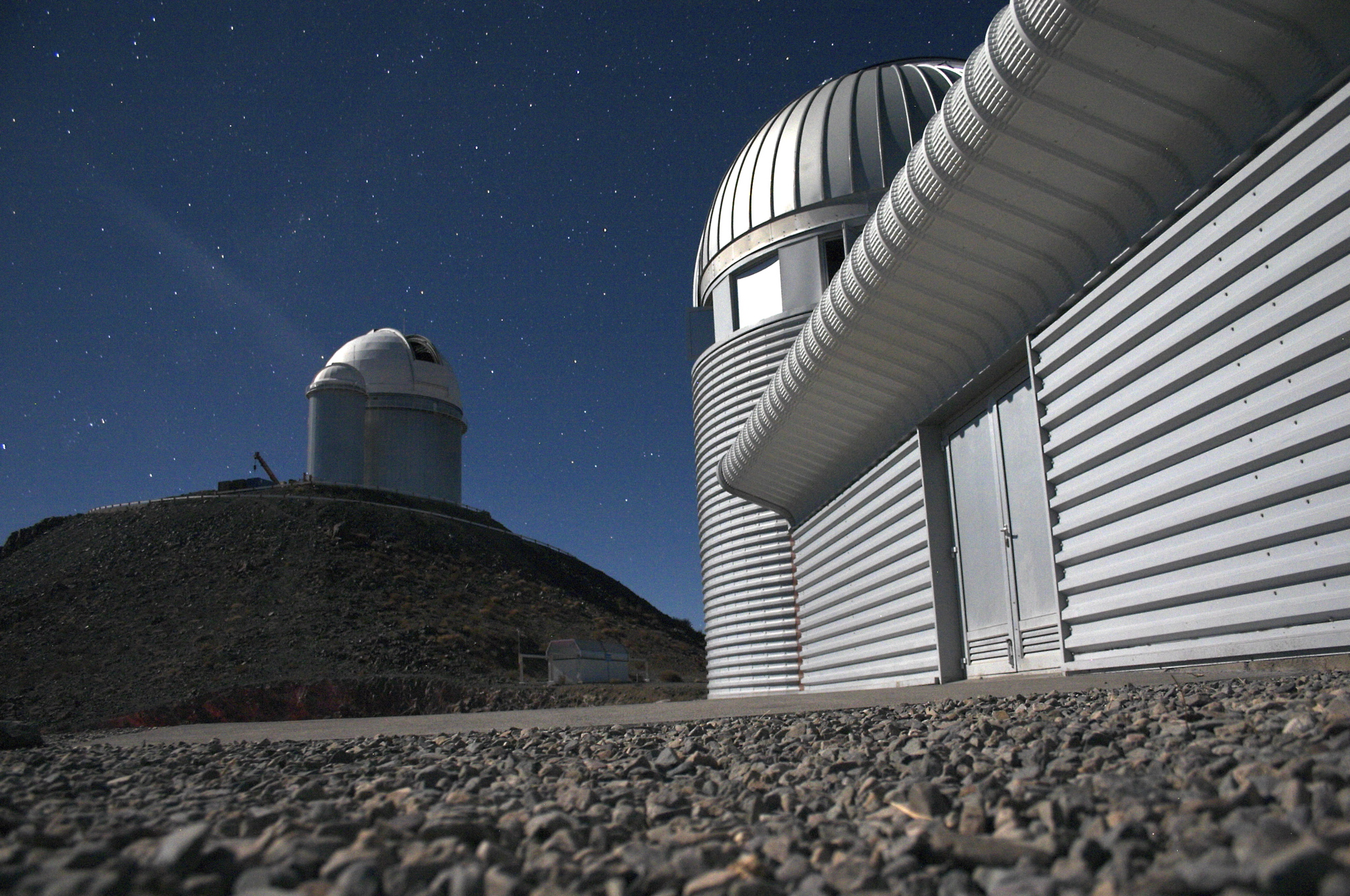
Euler Telescope and the ESO 3.6 m Telescope (background).

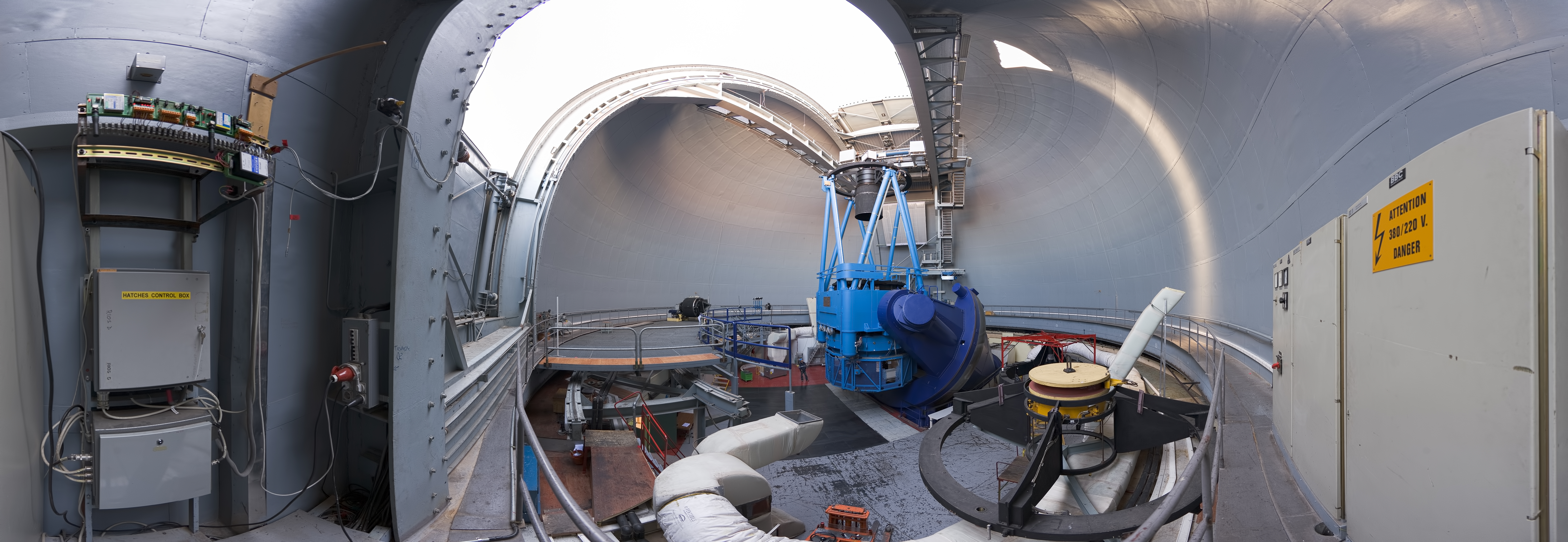
Panoramic view of the ESO 3.6-metre telescope's dome.

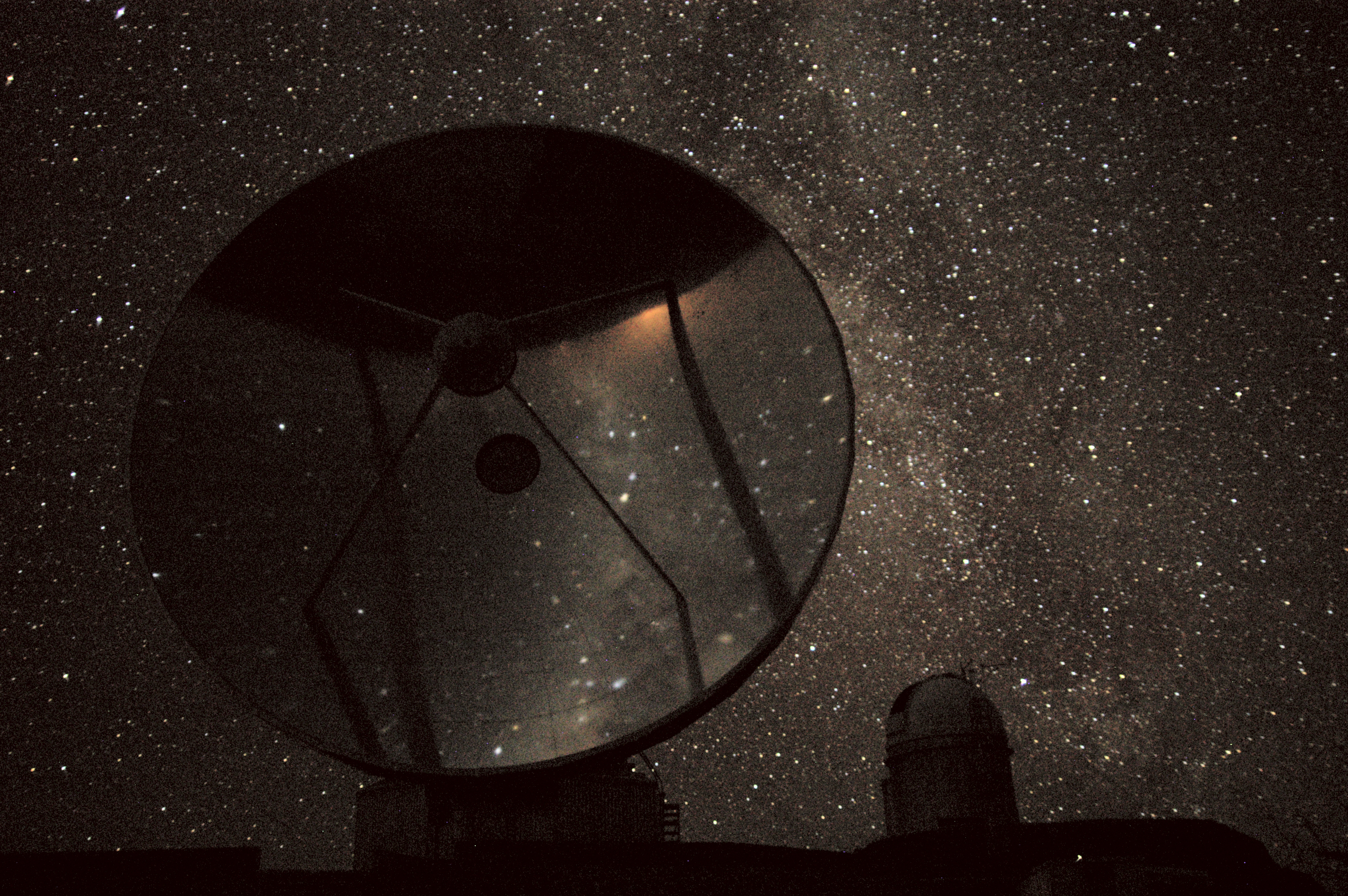
La Silla—Early evening scenery (in the distant right: the ESO 3.6 m T.)

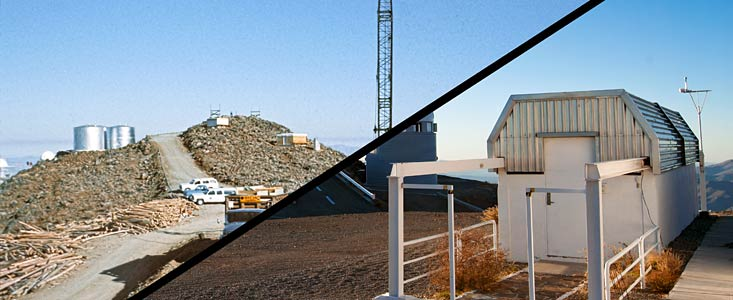
Construction of the ESO 3.6-metre telescope.

=== Images from telescope ===
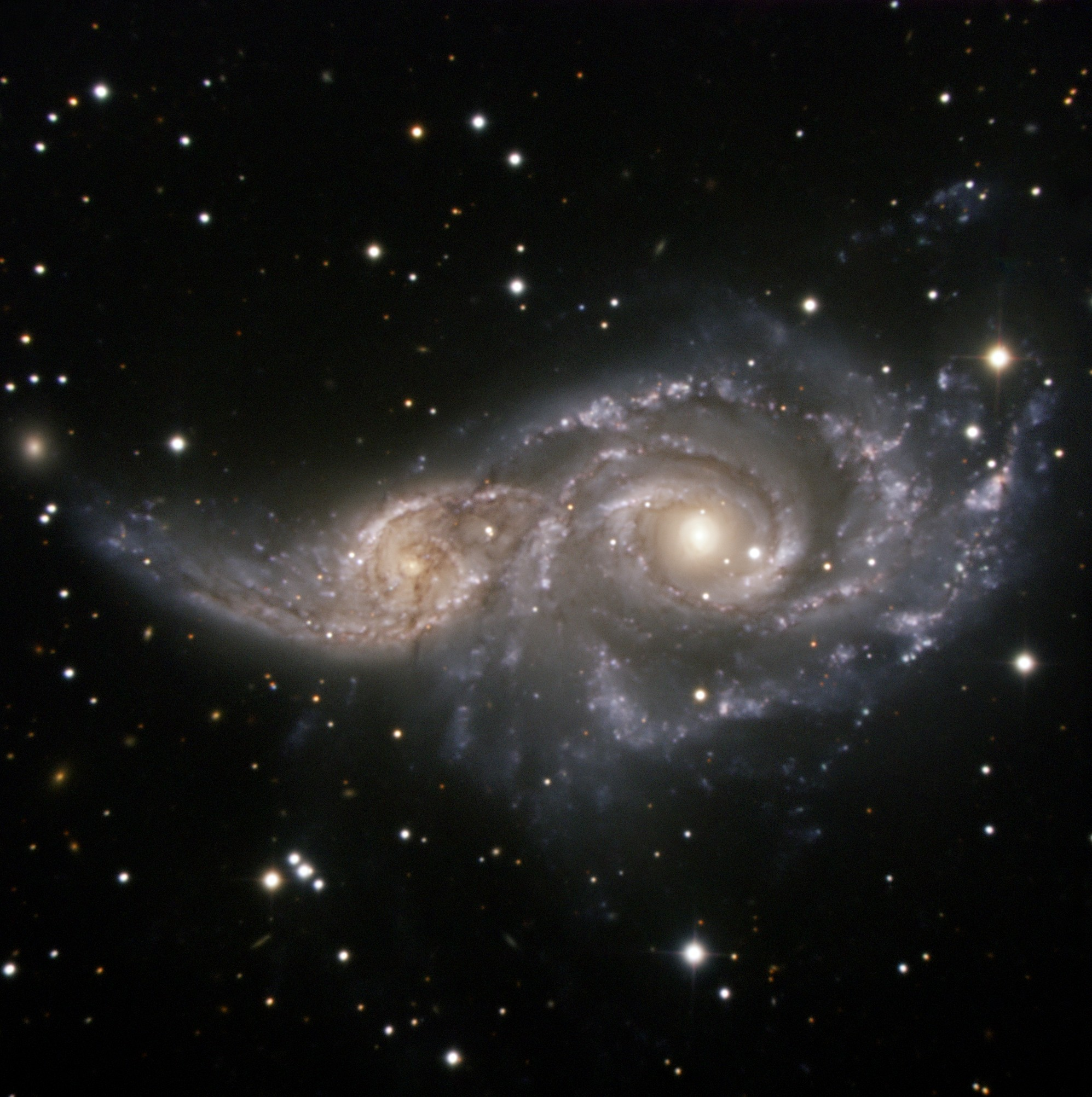
NGC 2207 and IC 2163, two interacting galaxies (captured by EFOSC2)

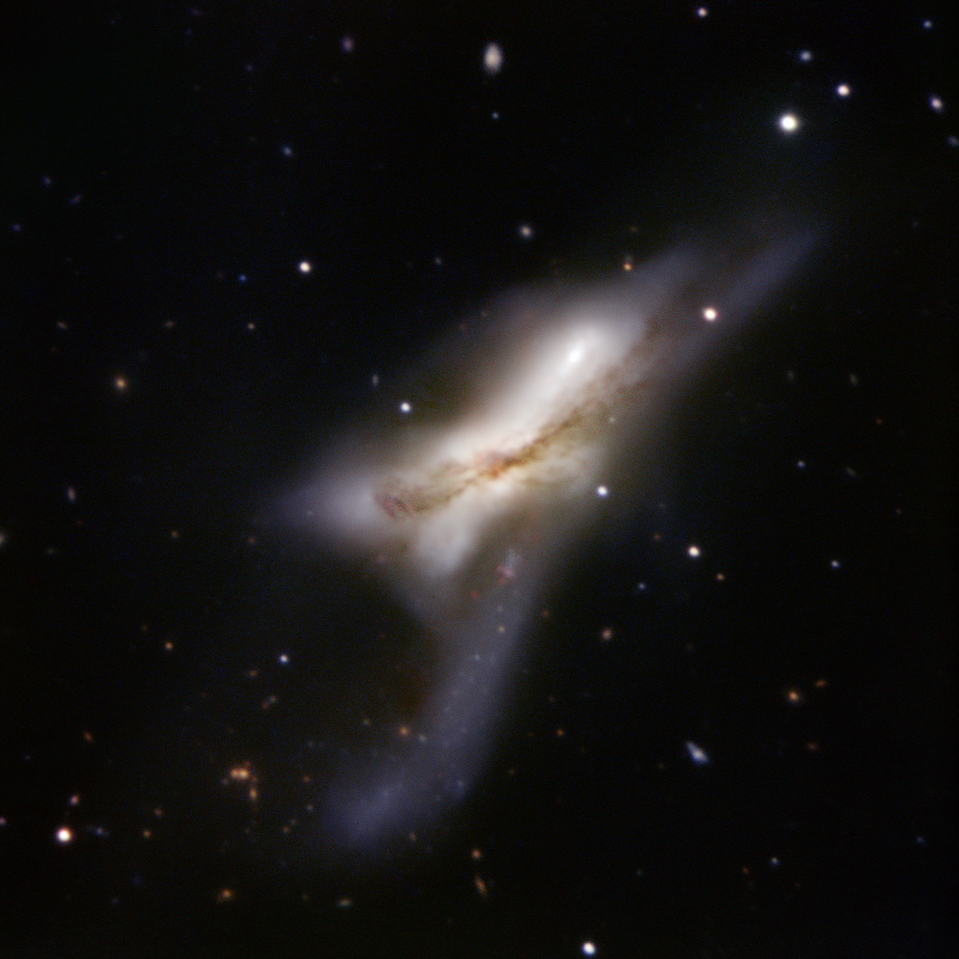
NGC 520, colliding galaxies

== See also ==
- List of largest optical reflecting telescopes
- List of largest optical telescopes in the 20th century
