= Kraus-type radio telescope =

Type of radio telescope designed by American astrophysicist John D. Kraus

The Kraus-type radio telescope design was created by Dr. John D. Kraus (1910–2004).

Kraus-type telescopes are transit instruments, where the flat primary mirror reflects radio waves towards the spherical secondary mirror, which focuses it towards a mobile focal carriage. They are the radio equivalent of an optical siderostat. The primary tilts north–south to select any object near the meridian, while the focal carriage moves east–west along railroad ties to track objects near transit.

== Examples ==
The Nançay radio telescope in France and the former Big Ear in Ohio are Kraus-type telescopes, and the southern section of the RATAN-600 ring in Russia can operate as a Kraus-type telescope.
