= Special Astrophysical Observatory of the Russian Academy of Science =

Astronomical observatory near Nizhny Arkhyz, Russia

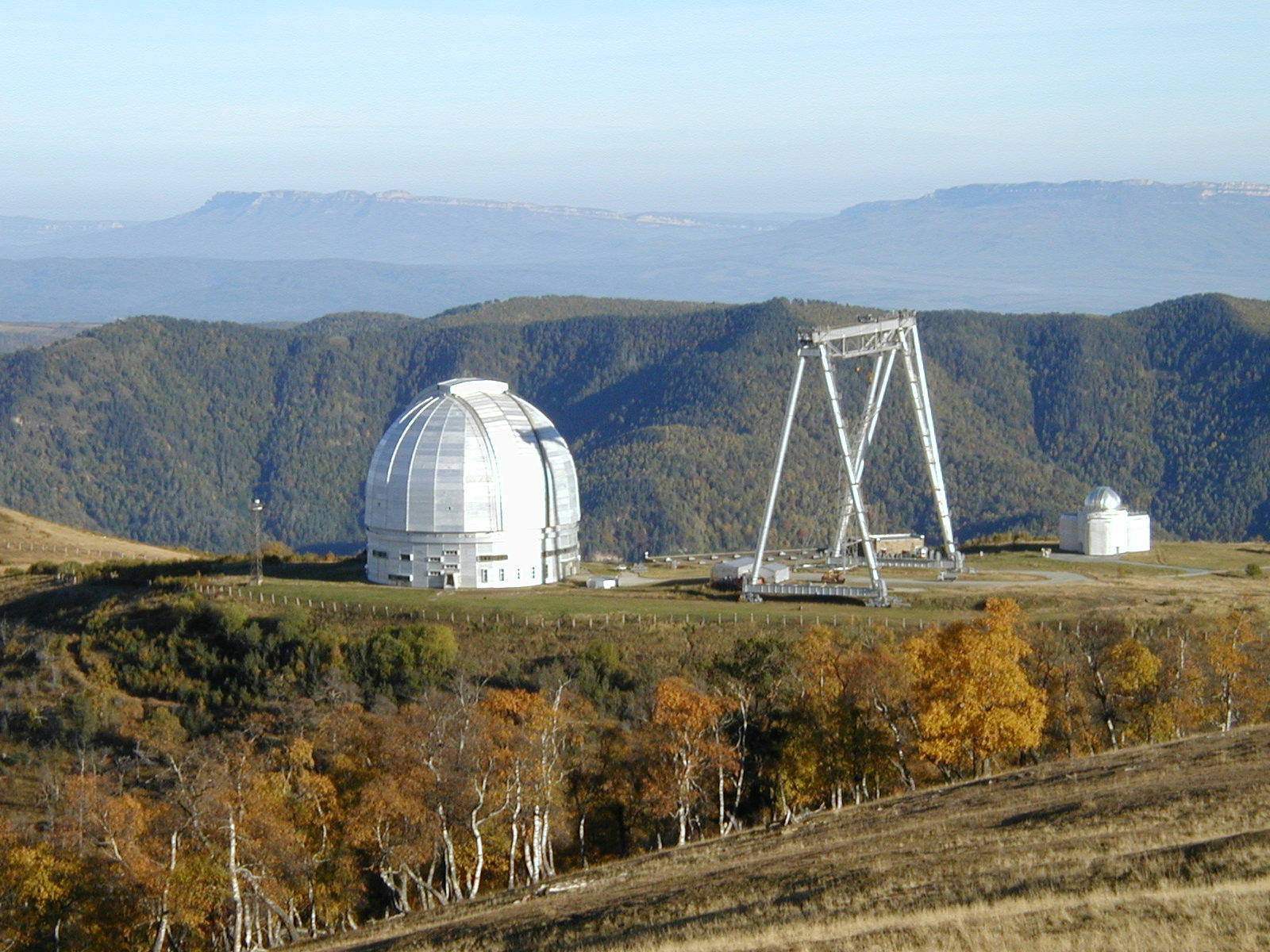
- Alternative names: Special Astrophysical Observatory
- Observatory code: 115
- Location: Karachay-Cherkessia, Russia
- Coordinates: 43°38′49″N 41°26′26″E
- Website: www.sao.ru
- Telescopes: BTA-6; RATAN-600
- Location of Special Astrophysical Observatory of the Russian Academy of Science
- Related media on Commons

The Special Astrophysical Observatory of the Russian Academy of Science (SAO RAS; Russian: Специальная Астрофизическая Обсерватория) is an astronomical observatory, set up in 1966 in the USSR, and now operated by the Russian Academy of Sciences. Based in the Bolshoi Zelenchuk Valley of the Greater Caucasus near the village of Nizhny Arkhyz, the observatory houses the BTA-6 and RATAN-600, an optical and radio telescope, respectively. The two instruments are about 20 km (12 mi) apart.

== BTA-6 optical telescope ==
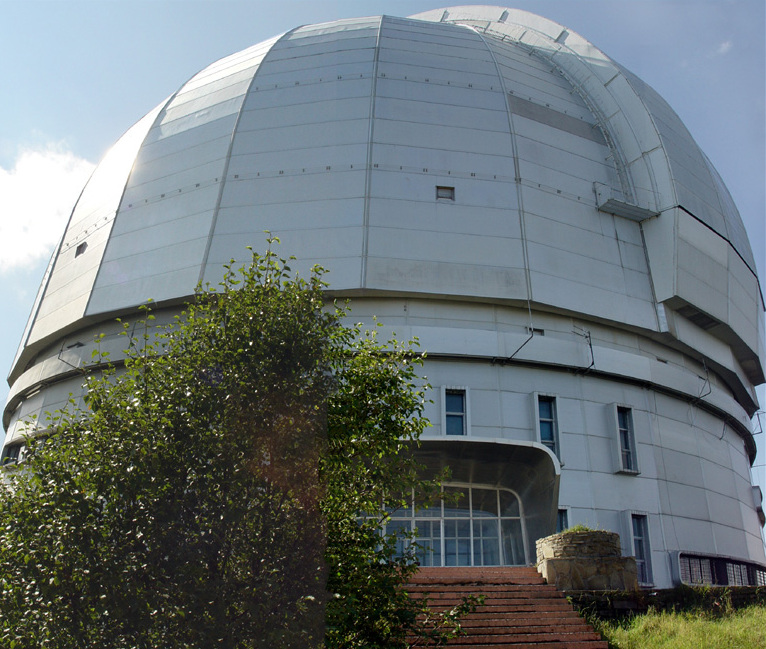
BTA-6 as seen from in front of the main entrance.

The BTA-6 (Bolshoi Teleskop Altazimutalny; Большой Телескоп Альтазимутальный, or Large Altazimuth Telescope), with first light in 1975, was for years the world's largest single primary mirror optical reflecting telescope. The BTA-6's primary mirror has a diameter of 6 metres (236 inches) and is housed in a 48 m (157.5 ft) diameter dome at an altitude of 2,070 m (6,791 ft).

It held the record from its completion until 1993, when it was surpassed by the Keck 1 telescope, Hawaii. Telescopes of comparable or larger size have subsequently employed flexible or segmented mirrors, and the BTA-6 remained the world's largest rigid-mirror telescope until the advent of spin-casting technology (which produced, for example, the single 8.4-meter primary mirror of the Large Binocular Telescope in the late 1990s). Its altazimuth mount dictates the need for a field derotation mechanism to maintain the orientation of the field of view.

Initial results were disappointing due to cracking of the first borosilicate mirror, which was replaced in 1978. The large housing dome and massive 42 tonne mirror make it difficult to maintain the telescope at a suitable constant temperature during observing sessions. Atmospheric turbulence caused by windflow over the nearby Caucasus peaks can lead to poor seeing at the site, and observations with an angular resolution better than an arcsecond are rare.

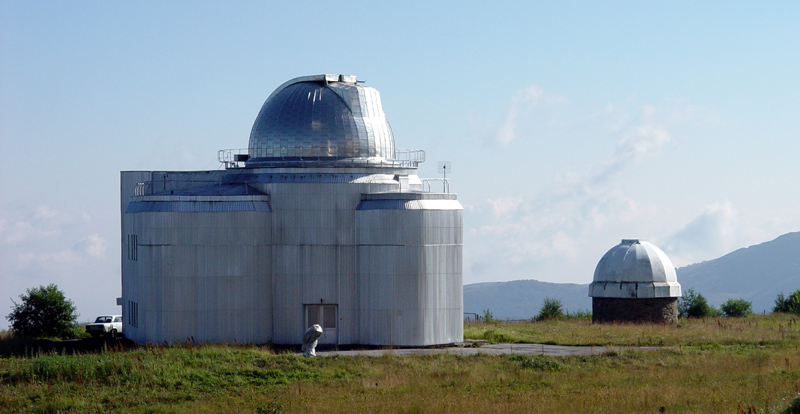
The 1-meter Zeiss-1000 and the 60-centimeter Zeiss behind it

== Other optical telescopes ==
Along with the BTA-6, the SAO operates two smaller telescopes at the BTA site, both built by Carl Zeiss AG. Both instruments are used in support of BTA-6 programs, as well as independent observation runs. On the advice of the SAO, programs originally booked for the BTA-6 can be moved to these telescopes, which takes up about 10% of their time.

The larger instrument, the 1 m Zeiss-1000, is located a few hundred meters from BTA-6 in its own building, which consists of a series of offices surrounding the main cylindrical instrument building with the dome on top. First light on the Zeiss-1000 was in 1990, and the installation, including additional instrumentation, was completed in 1993.

In 1994 they were joined by a 60 cm Zeiss instrument, formerly part of the Kazan State University's observatory. This is located a few tens of meters from the Zeiss-1000, in a much simpler building consisting only of the dome and supporting masonry walls.

== RATAN-600 radio telescope ==
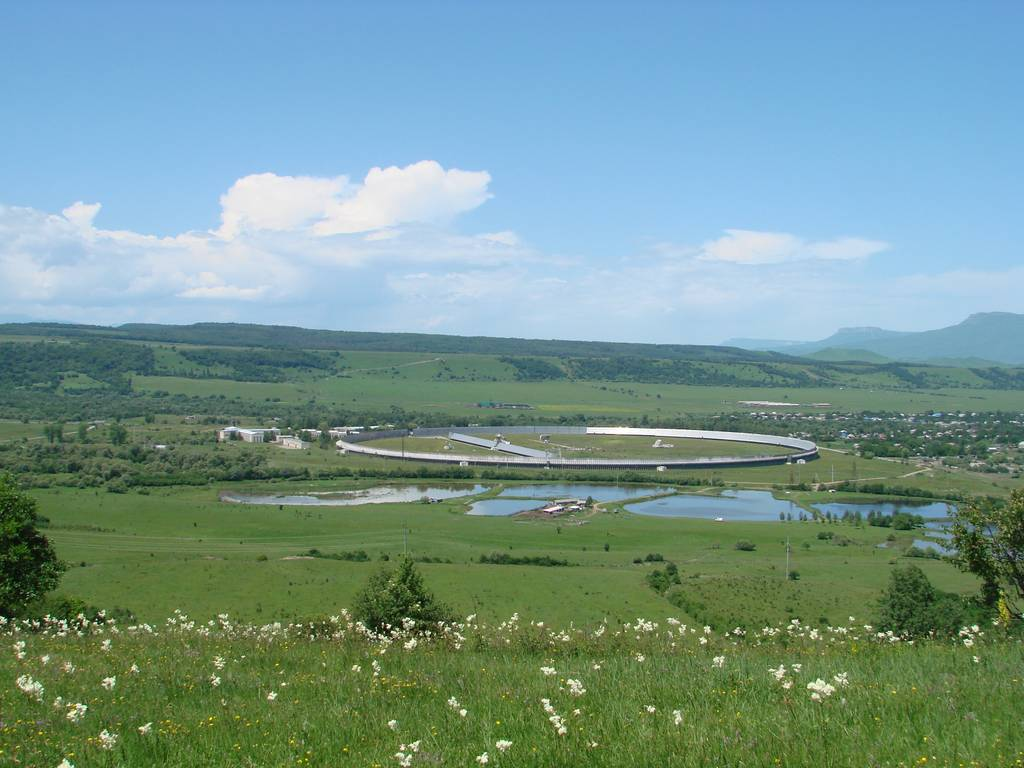
The RATAN-600 Radio Telescope

The RATAN-600 radio telescope (Russian: РАТАН-600 – РАдио Телескоп Академии Наук, or the Academy of Science Radio Telescope), which consists of a 576 m diameter circle of rectangular radio reflectors, is also based at the observatory at an altitude of 970 m. (Coordinates 43°49′34.20″N 41°35′12.06″E.) Each of the 895 2×7.4 m reflectors can be pointed towards a central conical secondary mirror, or to one of five parabolic cylinders. Each reflector is combined with an instrumentation cabin containing various receivers and instruments. The overall effect is that of a partially steerable antenna with the resolving power of a 600 m diameter dish (when using the central conical receiver), making it the world's largest diameter individual radio telescope.

The telescope can operate in three modes:

- Two-mirror system: An sector of the ring focuses waves to a cylindrical secondary mirror and further onto the receivers
- Three-mirror system: The linear plane mirror reflects the waves to the south sector of the ring, which in turn focuses on a cylindrical secondary and onto the receivers (Periscope mirror of Kraus-type system)
- Entire ring: For observations near the zenith the entire ring can be used, together with the conical secondary mirror and its receivers

Independent observations at various discrete azimuths are possible simultaneously: For this a sector of the ring is used with one of the secondary mirror and receiver units, the later which can be positioned on railway tracks – meanwhile another sector in conjunction with another secondary mirror can be used for an independent observation. At a wavelength of 8 cm, the effective collecting area of the entire ring is 1,000 square metres (11,000 sq ft) with a resolving power in the horizontal plane of 1 arcminute.

The RATAN-600 is primarily operated as a transit telescope, in which the rotation of the earth is used to sweep the telescope focus across the subject of observation. Radio frequency observations can be made in the frequency band 610 MHz to 30 GHz, though primarily in the centimetric waveband, with an angular resolution of up to 2 arcseconds. Observation of the Sun at radio wavelengths, in particular of the solar corona, has been a long-standing focus of the RATAN-600's scientific programme. It has also contributed to radio observation for the SETI project. The RATAN-600 has not been dogged by the technical problems of the neighbouring BTA-6.

== See also ==
- List of largest optical reflecting telescopes
- List of radio telescopes

== References and further reading ==
- Parijskij, N & Korol'kov, D (1987). "Experiment Cold: The first deep sky survey with the RATAN-600 radio telescope". Astrophysics and Space Physics Review. 5: 39–179. Bibcode:1987ASPRv...5...39P.
- Ioannisiani BK; Neplokhov EM; Kopylov IM; Rylov VS; Snezhko LI (1982). "The Zelenchuk 6M telescope (BTA) of the USSR Academy of Sciences". Instrumentation for Astronomy with Large Optical Telescopes. Astrophysics and Space Science Library. Vol. 92. pp. 3–10. Bibcode:1982ASSL...92....3I. doi:10.1007/978-94-009-7787-7_1. ISBN 978-94-009-7789-1.
