= First light (astronomy) =

First use of a telescope

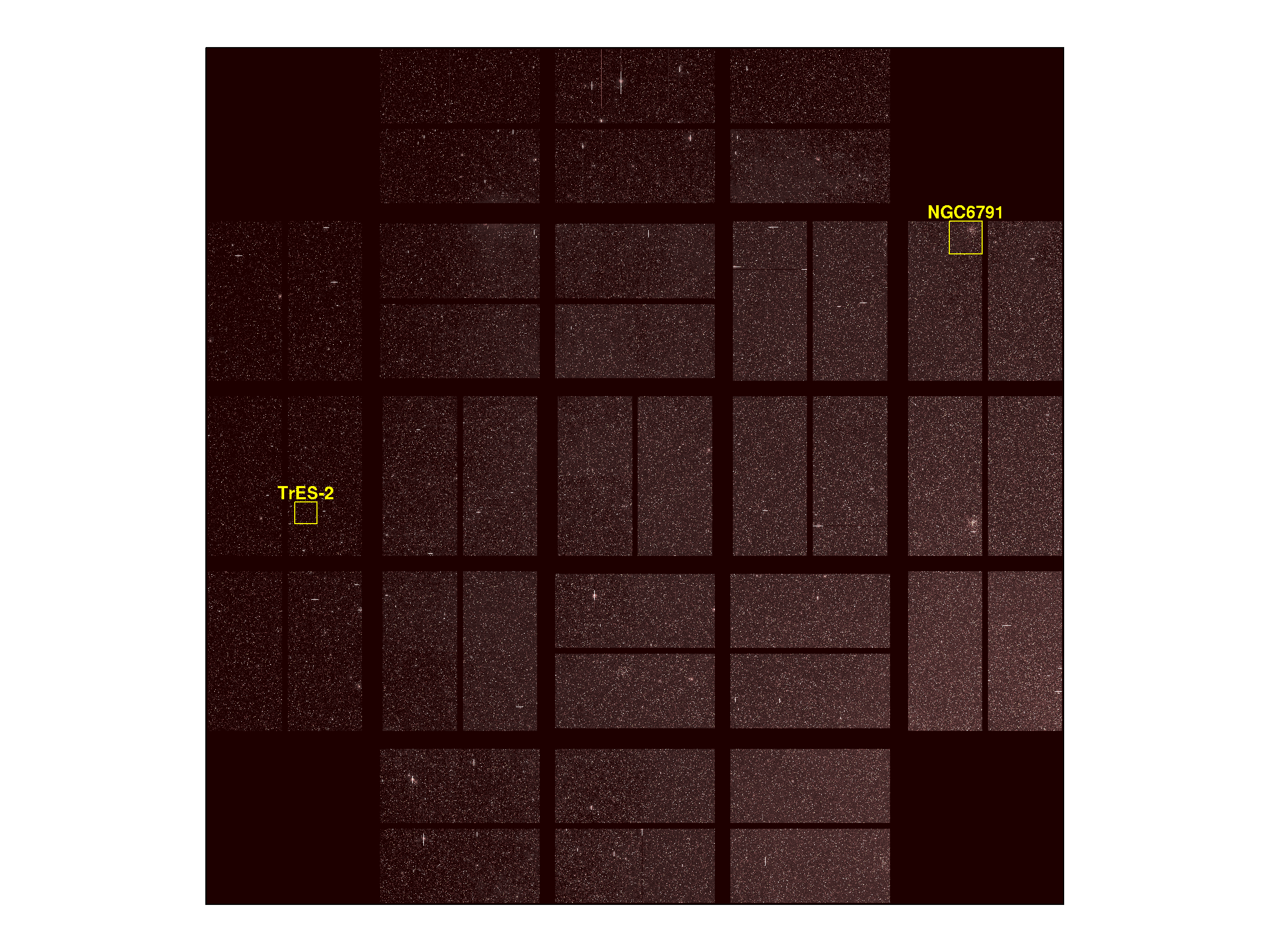
First light image from the Kepler space telescope with two points of interest outlined. Celestial north is toward the lower left corner.

In astronomy, first light is the first use of a new instrument, typically a telescope, to take an astronomical image after it has been constructed. This is often not the first viewing using the telescope, as optical tests are usually performed beforehand to adjust the components.

First released image from the Vera C. Rubin Observatory, the Trifid and Lagoon nebulae, released on 23 June 2025.

== See also ==
- First light (cosmology)
