= Mercury mirror =

Mercury mirror can mean:

- A glass mirror created by mercury silvering
  - Mercury glass mirror
- A component of liquid-mirror telescopes
