= Liquid mirror =

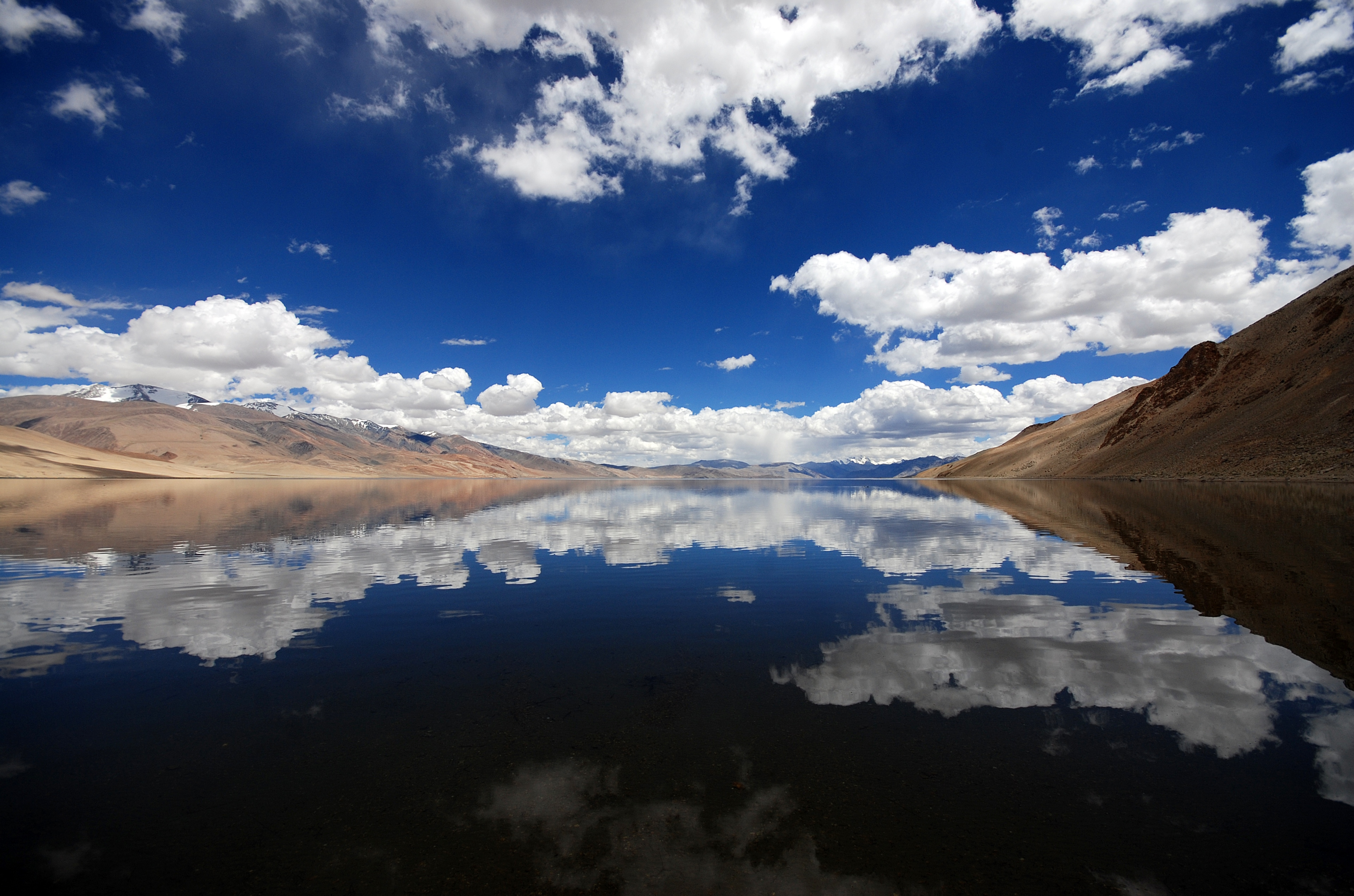
Lake reflecting the sky

Liquid mirror may refer to:

- A reflecting surface created by a liquid
  - See also specular reflection
- Liquid-mirror telescope
  - Liquid-mirror space telescope
