= Purple Crow Lidar =

Liquid mirror telescope

The Purple Crow Lidar is a powerful lidar (laser radar) that emits pulses of intensely bright light. The bright light scatters off air molecules, and the reflections are collected by a large telescope.

== Telescope ==
The telescope is formed by rotating liquid mercury at 10 r.p.m. in a 2.65-m diameter container. This liquid mirror technology has been made and developed at Université Laval in Québec City. Such rotating measurements allow air density, pressure, temperature, and composition to be measured. which can be useful to collect data for global warming and weather prediction.

== Weather prediction ==
This chart is used to determine and predict the weather at Purple Crow Lidar Facility in London Ontario for astronomical observing.

== Location ==
The Purple Crow operates from the Echo Base Observatory located at Western's Environmental Science Field Station located near London, Ontario, Canada.

== People in charge ==
The Purple Crow Lidar research project is headed by Professor Robert J. Sica in the Physics Department at UWO London Ontario. Its main support comes from the Natural Science and Engineering Research Council of Canada (NSERC).

== See also ==
- Large Zenith Telescope
- Liquid-mirror telescope
