= Devasthal Observatory =

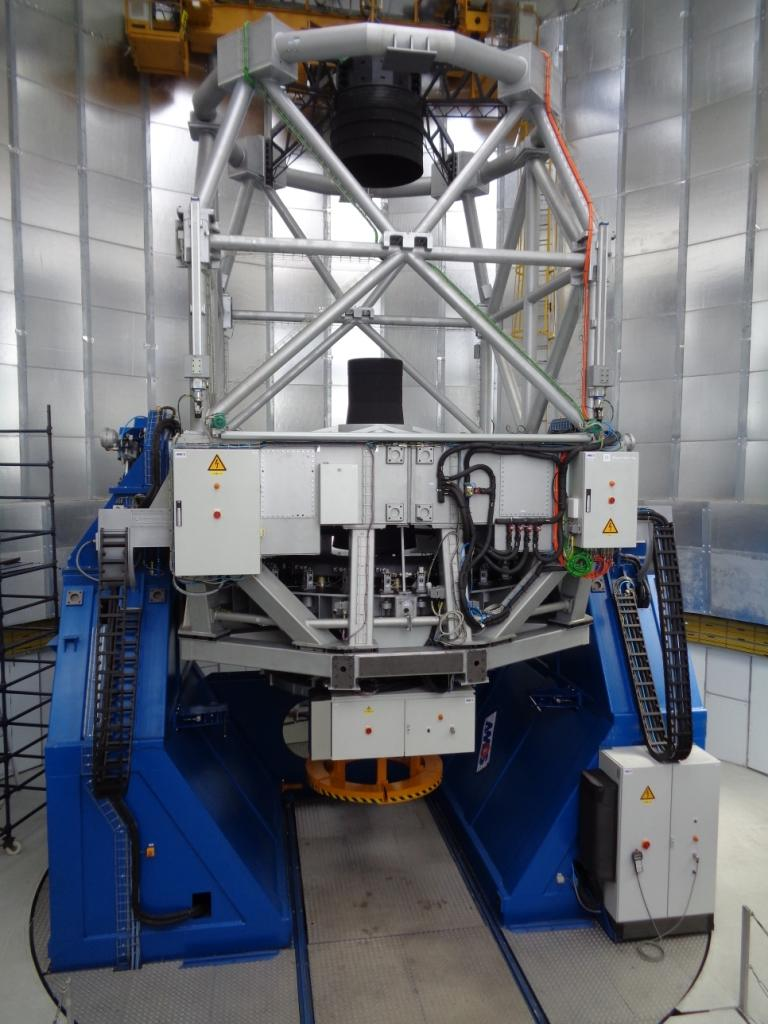
- Organization: Aryabhatta Research Institute of Observational Sciences
- Location: Nainital district, Kumaon division, Uttarakhand, India
- Coordinates: 29°21′42″N 79°41′06″E
- Altitude: 2,450 m (8,040 ft)
- Established: 1998
- Website: www.aries.res.in
- Telescopes: 1.3m Devasthal Optical Telescope; 3.6m Devasthal Optical Telescope
- Location of Devasthal Observatory
- Related media on Commons

Devasthal is an observatory in the district of Nainital, Kumaon, India. The literal meaning of the place is "abode of god". The observatory is situated in the Kumaon Himalayas at an altitude of 2,450 meters. Devasthal peak is an emerging optical astronomical site for Indian telescopes. Currently, a 130-cm optical telescope is working at the site. The sites are managed by the Aryabhatta Research Institute of Observational Sciences (ARIES), Nainital.

The site has already received a 360-cm telescope and a 400-cm liquid mirror telescope which is under construction & likely to be completed by the year 2022. A survey for installing solar telescope is also being carried out near the peak. The place is well equipped with guest house, canteen, internet connection, water and electric supply since 2008.

Devasthal is located 9 km from Dhanachuli, the nearest town in Nainital district.

== Facilities ==
The Devasthal Observatory campus includes a base complex with roads, control buildings and support infrastructure. Aryabhatta Research Institute of Observational Sciences (ARIES) acquired about 41,692 m^{2} of government land for the site, encompassing telescope enclosures, access roads and base‐camp areas. A dedicated aluminizing plant at the site can coat mirrors up to 3.7 m in diameter, enabling in‐situ mirror maintenance. A guesthouse and related hostel facilities are provided for visiting scientists and students.The campus has all essential utilities (electric power, high‐speed Internet, water supply, etc.) to support night‐time observing and instrumentation. ARIES also maintains an on‐site control room and data center for remote operation of the telescopes. Overall, Devasthal's infrastructure is designed to support modern optical astronomy, with an eye toward continuous monitoring of variable and transient objects.

== Telescopes and Instruments ==
Devasthal Observatory currently hosts multiple optical telescopes of moderate to large aperture:

3.6m Devasthal Optical Telescope (DOT) is a modern Ritchey–Chrétien telescope, the 3.6 m DOT is India's largest optical telescope. Built by the Belgian firm AMOS and commissioned in 2016, it is a national facility run by ARIES. The DOT has three Cassegrain ports (one axial and two side ports), allowing up to three instruments to be mounted simultaneously. Instruments include CCD imagers, an infrared camera (TIRCAM2), and spectrographs. In particular, ARIES has developed the Aries Devasthal Faint Object Spectrograph & Camera (ADFOSC), a low-cost, India-built optical spectrograph, which was commissioned on the 3.6 m DOT. The telescope facility includes a control room, data center and an onsite mirror aluminizing chamber.

4.0 m International Liquid Mirror Telescope (ILMT) is a unique zenith‐pointing telescope using a rotating 4.0 m-diameter liquid mercury mirror. Constructed in collaboration with institutions in Belgium and Canada, it achieved first light on 29 April 2022 and was formally inaugurated on 21 March 2023. The ILMT scans a fixed strip of sky passing overhead each night (using Time-Delay-Integration imaging with SDSS g′, r′, i′ filters). Its scientific program focuses on time-domain surveys: it is optimized to detect transient and variable phenomena along the zenith strip, such as supernovae, gravitational lensing events, near-Earth asteroids, space debris and other time-varying sources.

1.3 m Devasthal Fast Optical Telescope (DFOT) is a fast (f/4) Ritchey–Chrétien/Cassegrain telescope installed in late 2010. Built by DFM Engineering (USA) and run by ARIES, it provides a wide ~66′ field of view. DFOT is used for a broad range of optical programs, particularly time‐critical and survey projects. According to ARIES, it is “well suited for diverse science programs” such as detection and follow-up of transient events (e.g. gamma-ray bursts, supernovae), deep imaging of star clusters, variable stars, exoplanet transits, AGN/quasar monitoring and studies of faint galaxies. This wide-field capability complements the larger DOT, allowing rapid photometric monitoring of variable objects and candidate targets from space missions.

Other telescopes include a 50 cm Schmidt camera (a wide-field survey instrument) and dedicated solar and atmospheric instruments at the site, though the primary focus of the Devasthal campus is on the above optical telescopes.

== Administration and Access ==
The Devasthal Observatory is operated by ARIES, an autonomous institute under India's Department of Science and Technology. ARIES solicits telescope time through regular proposal calls. For example, observing time on the 3.6 m DOT is shared as 60% open-time for competitive proposals from Indian institutions, 33% guaranteed for ARIES researchers, and 7% reserved for Belgian astronomers (reflecting its Indo-Belgian partnership). A further ~10% of science time is set aside as Director's discretionary time. Proposals (from Indian and, when permitted, international scientists) are submitted online via the ARIES DOPSES system, successful proposers receive proprietary data access (typically for one year) before archival release. Devasthal is reached by paved roads branching off the Nainital–Almora highway; the nearest major city is Nainital (~60 km west). ARIES issues technical specifications and user support for all instruments. Notably, the DOT was developed under a 2007 contract with the Belgian firm AMOS and was inaugurated jointly by the Prime Ministers of India and Belgium in March 2016, underscoring the international collaboration.

== See also ==
- Astrotourism in India
- List of planetariums
- List of astronomical observatories
