= V29 =

V29 may refer to:

- Cloudcroft Observatory, in New Mexico
- Fokker V.29, a German World War I fighter aircraft prototype
- ITU-T V.29, a modem standard
- SMS V29, a torpedo boat of the Imperial German Navy
