= Honeycomb mirror =

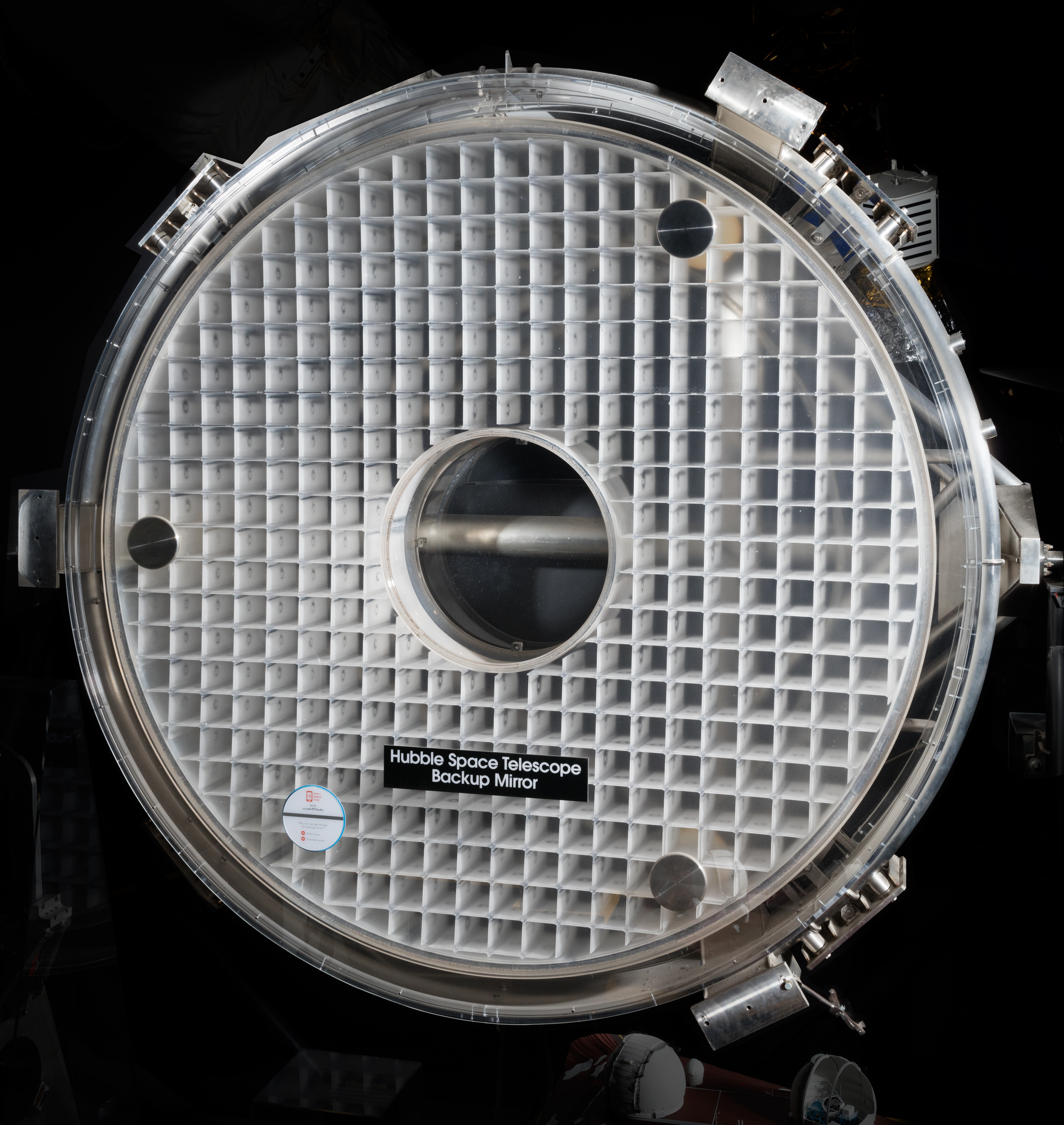
The un-coated backup primary mirror for the Hubble Space Telescope showing its honeycomb structure.

A honeycomb mirror is a large mirror usually used as the primary mirror in astronomical reflecting telescopes whose face is supported by a ribbed structure that resembles a honeycomb. The design provides sufficient rigidity for ultra-high-precision optics while reducing the weight of the mirror. The reduced weight, in turn, allows smaller, lighter support and control structures, reducing the overall cost of the telescope. The term may also refer to mirrors made up of a coordinated set of individual hexagonal mirrors.

The development of the honeycomb mirror has allowed the creation of larger instruments than would be feasible with solid mirrors. Solid mirrors are not only mechanically cumbersome, but are also difficult to cast and safely cool into a single, large blocks of glass. Honeycomb designs can reduce the weight of the mirror by as much as 80%.

The bending stiffness of a honeycomb mirror is given by:

$$D = \frac{E (h + t) t^2}{2(1 - \nu^2)}$$

where E is Young's modulus, h is the thickness of the honeycomb core at the center, and t is the thickness of the upper and bottom plates. The weight of a honeycomb mirror compared to a solid mirror is:

$$\frac{2t + \alpha h}{2t + h}$$

where α, being significantly less than 1, is the relative density of the core compared to the face plate.

== See also ==
- Liquid-mirror telescope
- List of largest optical reflecting telescopes
- List of telescope parts and construction
