= International Liquid Mirror Telescope =

Astronomical telescope in chapra, India

The International Liquid Mirror Telescope is a 4-meter telescope located inside the premises of Aryabhatta Research Institute of Observational Sciences (ARIES) in the city of Nainital, Uttarakhand, India. It is the first liquid-mirror telescope for astronomy in Asia and currently the largest liquid-mirror telescope in the world after the decommissioning of the Large Zenith Telescope.

== History ==
On 2 June 2022, the telescope saw its first light. On 12 June 2022, it came online. On 21 June 2022, it became ready to observe. On 21 March 2023, it was inaugurated by Jitendra Singh.

== Mechanism ==
The telescope uses elemental mercury as its mirror surface. The mercury is rotated about the axis of the telescope, and due to centrifugal force, takes a parabolic shape to focus incoming light.

== See also ==
- Large Zenith Telescope
- NASA Orbital Debris Observatory
