= Cloudcroft Observatory =

Observatory in New Mexico, United States

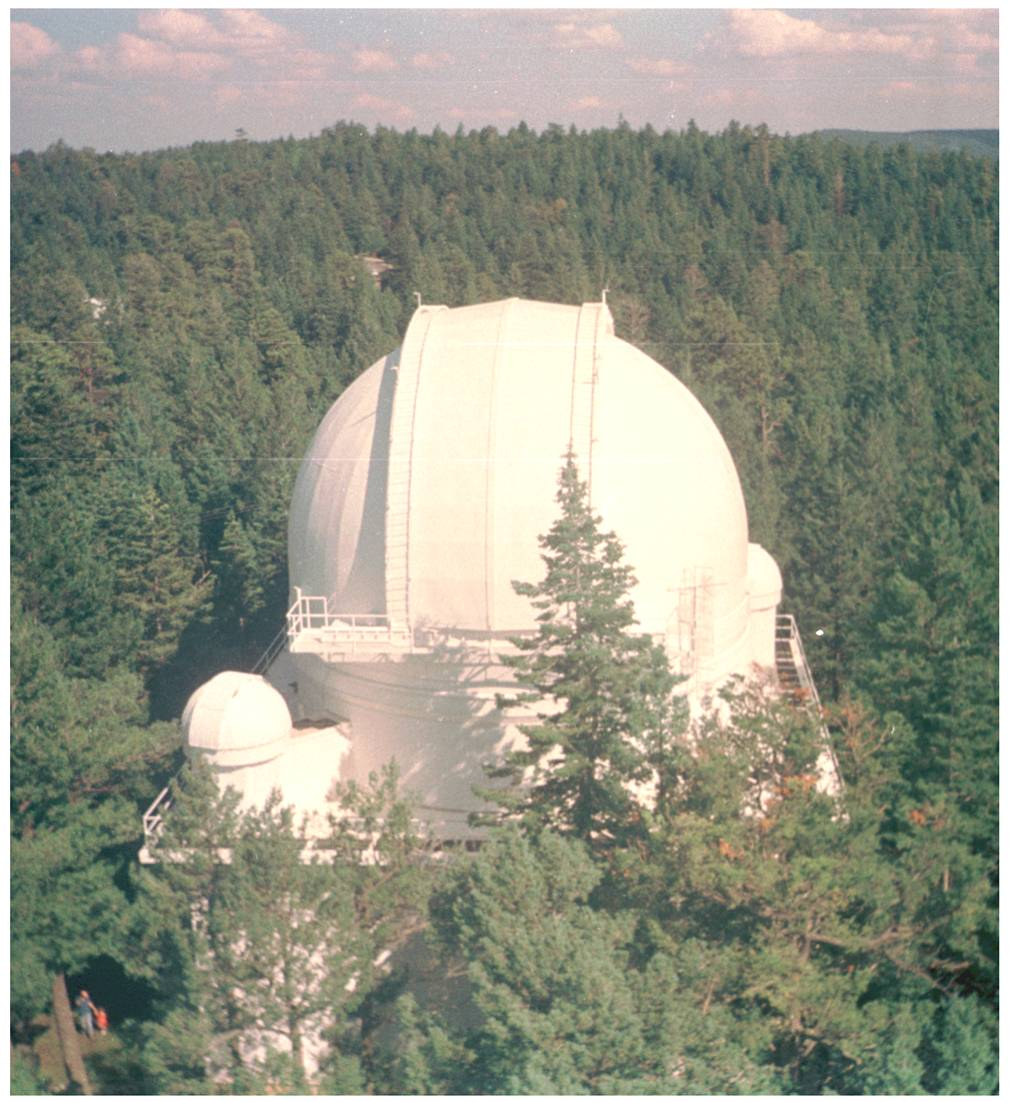
- Alternative names: NASA Orbital Debris Observatory
- Organization: U.S. Air Force
- Observatory code: V29
- Location: New Mexico
- Coordinates: 32°58′46″N 105°44′01″W
- Altitude: 2,751 m (9,026 ft)
- Established: 1962
- Closed: 1982

Telescopes
- EOST: 1.2 m reflector
- Location of Cloudcroft Observatory
- Related media on Commons

Cloudcroft Observatory (observatory code: V29) is an astronomical observatory located in the Lincoln National Forest near Cloudcroft, New Mexico, approximately 23 kilometers (14 mi) northeast of Alamogordo. It is owned by the Tzec Maun Foundation, a private astronomical organization.

Known as the Cloudcroft Electro-Optical Research Facility when it was built in 1962, it was owned by the U.S. Air Force (USAF) until 1982 and initially operated by the Air Force Avionics Laboratory (AFAL). It was used as part of a project to develop new techniques for detecting satellites with electronic imaging devices, which were eventually to replace Project Space Track's Baker-Nunn photographic system. From 1995 to 2002, the facility was known as the NASA Orbital Debris Observatory and hosted two telescopes funded and operated by NASA.

== History ==
The site near Cloudcroft was selected by AFAL in 1961 after several months of site characterization, and construction began in 1962. The First light of the Electro-Optical Surveillance Telescope (EOST) was achieved in 1964. The device was a 1.22 m (48 in) Newtonian telescope on a three-axis mount. The azimuth-elevation-azimuth configuration simplified tracking and allowed for good imaging of objects at the zenith. Aiming at poorly constrained targets was assisted by two small Naval sight guns placed in domes on opposite corners of the building. The first automated detection system, the FSR-2, was located at the site in the late 1960s in a separate building. It only operated for one year due to technical and financial reasons. AFAL continued Space Object Identification (SOI) research at Cloudcroft until 1975. At that time the facility was transferred to USAF Space and Missile Systems Organization (SAMSO).

In the late 1970s, the facility came under the control of the Air Force Geophysical Laboratory, which contracted with Sacramento Peak Observatory to perform various research. Guest researchers also had the opportunity to use the facility. The facility was deactivated in 1982, and in the late 1980s the telescope was transferred to the Jet Propulsion Laboratory's Table Mountain Observatory.

In 1995, NASA began using the facility, which was renamed as NASA Orbital Debris Observatory. A 3.0 m (120 in) liquid-mirror telescope was built in the main dome and operated from 1996 to 2001.

The facility has since been disposed of by the government and is now owned by a private astronomical organization, the Tzec Maun Foundation. As of April 2013, a 1.0 m (39 in) reflecting telescope was being tested in the main dome.

== See also ==
- GEODSS
- List of astronomical observatories
