= NASA Orbital Debris Observatory =

Astronomical observatory

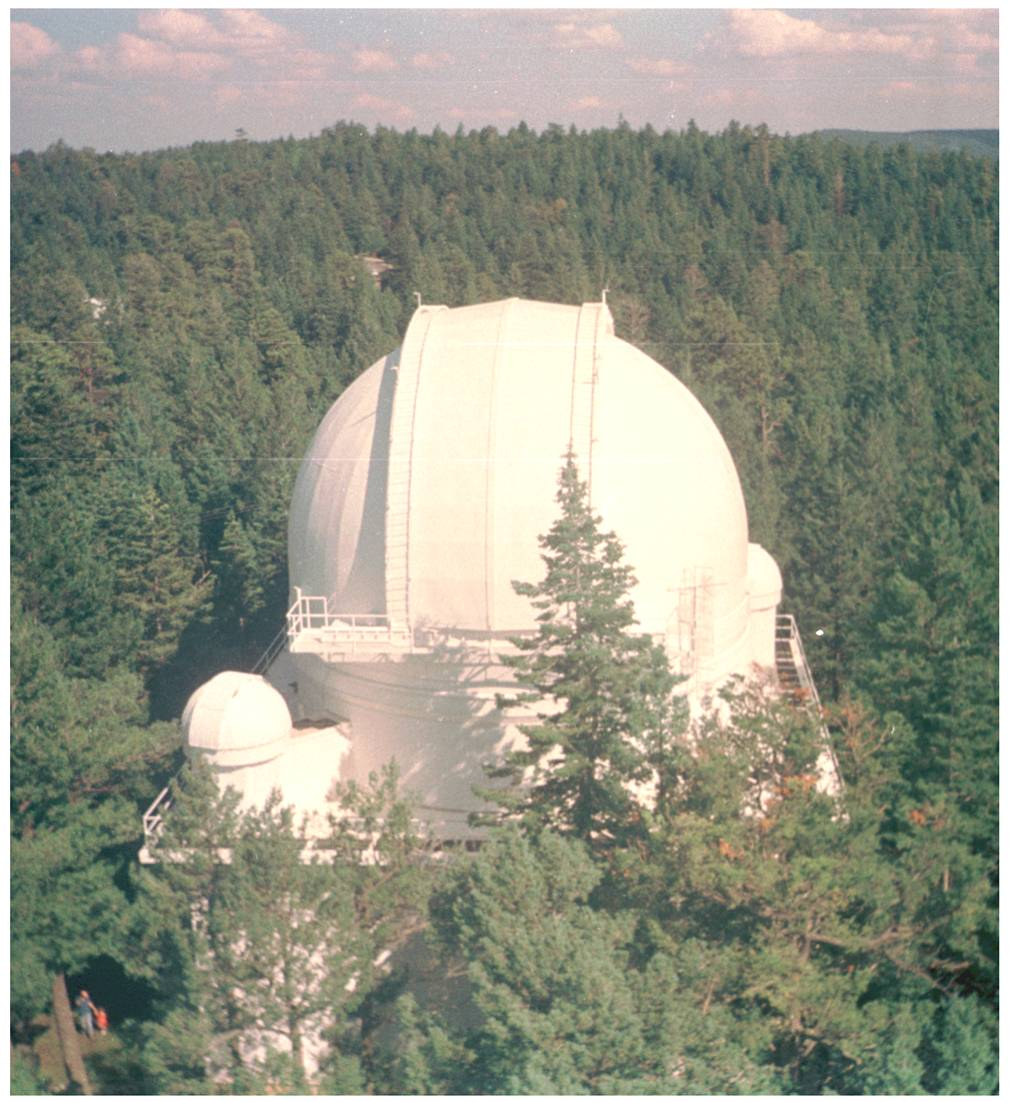
- NASA Orbital Debris Observatory
- Organization: NASA
- Location: Cloudcroft, Otero County, New Mexico
- Coordinates: 32°58′46″N 105°44′01″W
- Altitude: 2,751 m (9,026 ft)
- Established: 1995
- Closed: 2002

Telescopes
- NASA LMT: 3.0 m liquid mirror
- CCD Debris Telescope: 0.32 m reflector
- Location of NASA Orbital Debris Observatory

NASA Orbital Debris Observatory (NODO) was an astronomical observatory located in the Lincoln National Forest near Cloudcroft, New Mexico approximately 23 kilometers (14 mi) northeast of Alamogordo. From 1995 to 2002 it hosted two telescopes funded and operated by NASA that were dedicated to detecting orbital debris. The facility was initially called the Cloudcroft Electro-Optical Research Facility when it was completed in 1962, and was also known as the Cloudcroft Observatory. It is now privately owned by Embry-Riddle University.

== Telescopes ==
- The NASA-LMT was a 3 m (9.8 ft) aperture liquid-mirror telescope located in NODO's main dome. It consisted of a 3 m diameter parabolic dish that held 4 U.S. gallons (15 L) of a highly reflective liquid metal, mercury, spinning at a rate of 10 rpm, with sensors mounted above on a fixed structure. Due to the primary mirror's material, the NASA-LMT was configured as a zenith telescope. Using 20 narrowband filters, it cataloged space debris in Earth's orbit. The telescope was initially completed in 1994 at NASA's Johnson Space Center, and moved to Cloudcroft the following year, where it operated routinely until June 2002. The LMT was also used for the UBC-NASA Multi-Narrowband survey, which examined galaxies at moderate redshifts. When it was retired, some of the components were used in the 6 m (20 ft) Large Zenith Telescope in British Columbia.
- The 32 cm (13 in) CCD Debris Telescope (CDT) was a portable Schmidt camera equipped with a 512×512 pixel charge-coupled device (CCD) sensor. It operated at NODO from October 1997 until December 2001, and was used to characterize debris at or near geosynchronous orbit. It had previously operated at Rattlesnake Mountain Observatory and the Air Force Maui Optical and Supercomputing observatory. The CDT was donated to Embry–Riddle University after deactivation.

== Gallery ==
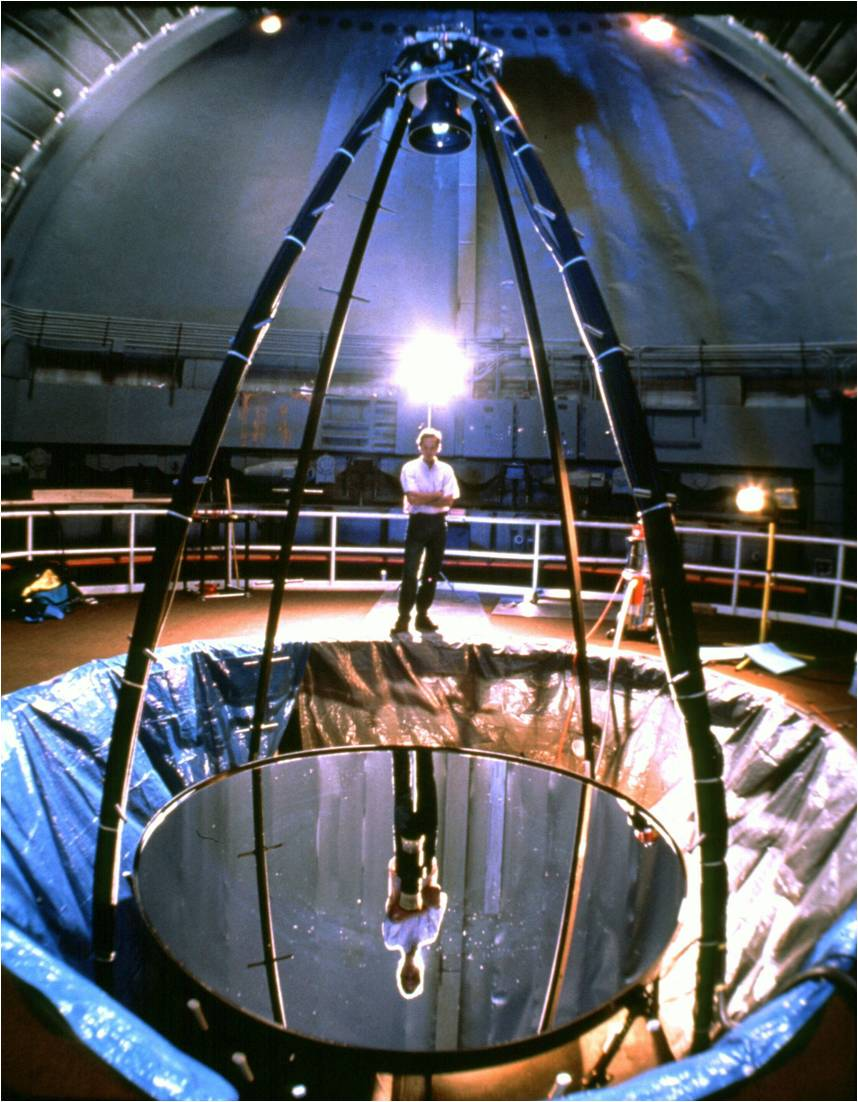
NASA Liquid Mirror Telescope

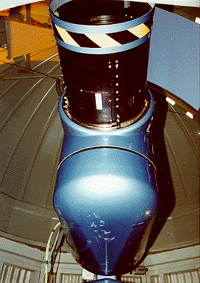
CCD Debris Telescope

== See also ==
- List of astronomical observatories
- List of largest optical reflecting telescopes
- List of largest optical telescopes in the 20th century
- ESA Space Debris Telescope
