= 3.6m Devasthal Optical Telescope =

Optical Telescope

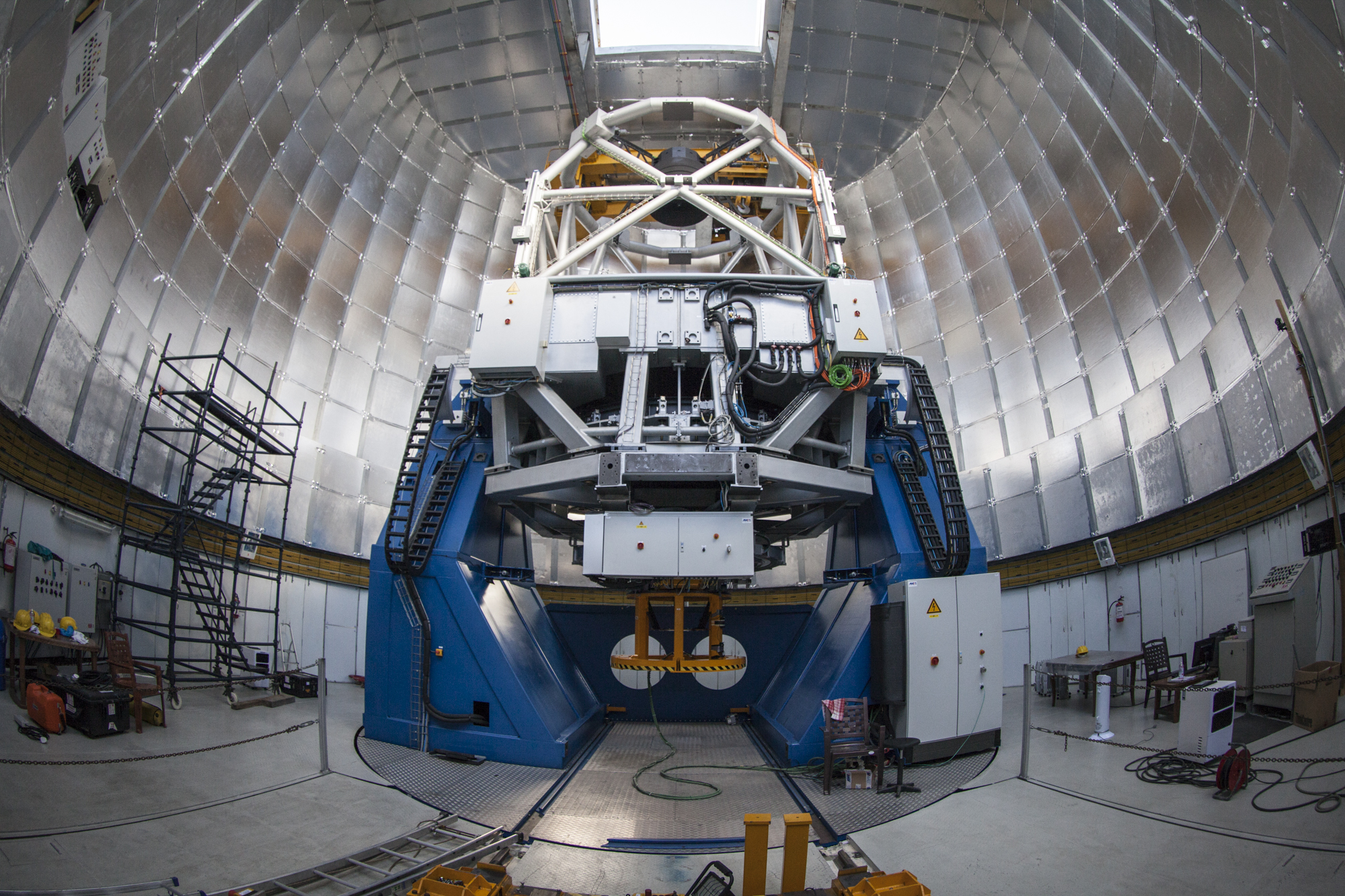
- ARIES 3.6m Telescope at Devasthal, India
- Part of: Devasthal Observatory
- Location(s): Nainital district, Kumaon division, Uttarakhand, India
- Coordinates: 29°21′39″N 79°41′04″E
- Altitude: 2,540 m (8,330 ft)
- Wavelength: 350 nm (860 THz)–5,000 nm (60 THz)
- Telescope style: Ritchey–Chrétien telescope
- Diameter: 3.6 m (11 ft 10 in)
- Focal length: 32.4 m (106 ft 4 in)
- Website: www.aries.res.in/facilities/astronomical-telescopes/360cm-telescope
- Location of 3.6m Devasthal Optical Telescope
- Related media on Commons

The 3.6m Devasthal (Hindi: देवस्थल) Optical Telescope (DOT) is a clear-aperture Ritchey–Chrétien telescope built by Aryabhatta Research Institute of Observational Sciences (ARIES), located at the Devasthal Observatory site, near Nainital, Kumaon, India. ARIES operates another 1.3m telescope at the same location. The telescope was activated remotely on 31 March 2016 by Indian Prime Minister Narendra Modi and Belgian Prime Minister Charles Michel from Brussels. The telescope optics were built in collaboration with the Belgian firm Advanced Mechanical and Optical System (AMOS).

The 3.6m DOT is currently the largest reflecting telescope in Asia. The telescope intends to fill a large longitudinal gap in the 4m class of telescopes in the Asia region. The telescope features an optical spectrograph, a CCD imager and a near-infrared spectrograph. The telescope is also the first of its kind in India that features an active optics system, featuring a wavefront sensor and pneumatic actuators which compensate for small distortions in the shape of the 4.3 tonne mirror due to gravity or atmospheric aberrations.

== See also ==
- Aryabhatta Research Institute of Observational Sciences
- List of largest optical reflecting telescopes
- Lists of telescopes
