= Primary mirror =

Main light-gathering source of reflecting telescope

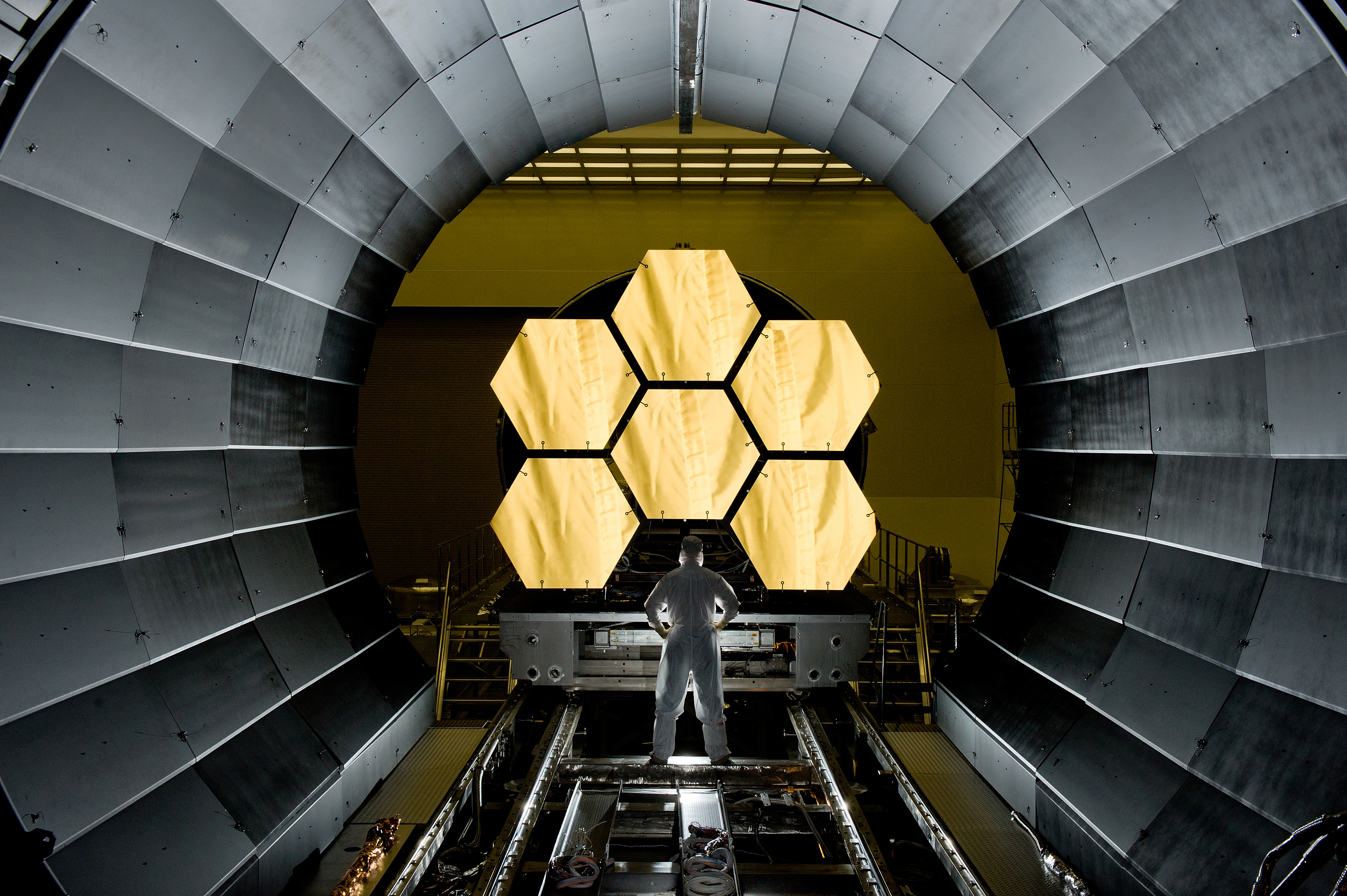
Six of the 18 primary mirrors of the James Webb Space Telescope being prepared for acceptance testing.

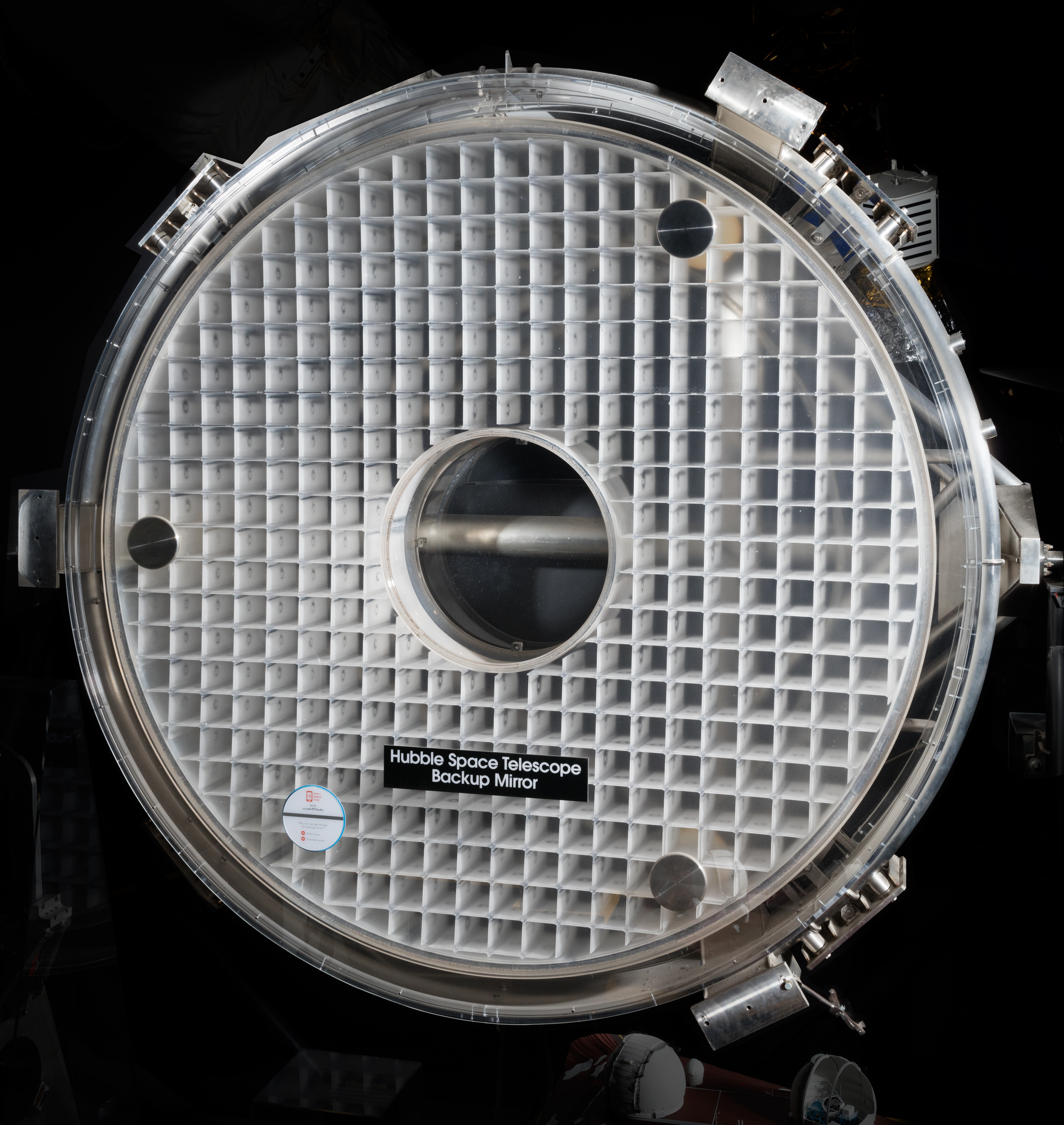
The correctly ground backup primary mirror built by Eastman Kodak for the Hubble space telescope (the mirror was never coated with a reflective surface, hence its honeycomb support structure is visible). It now resides in the National Air and Space Museum in Washington, DC.

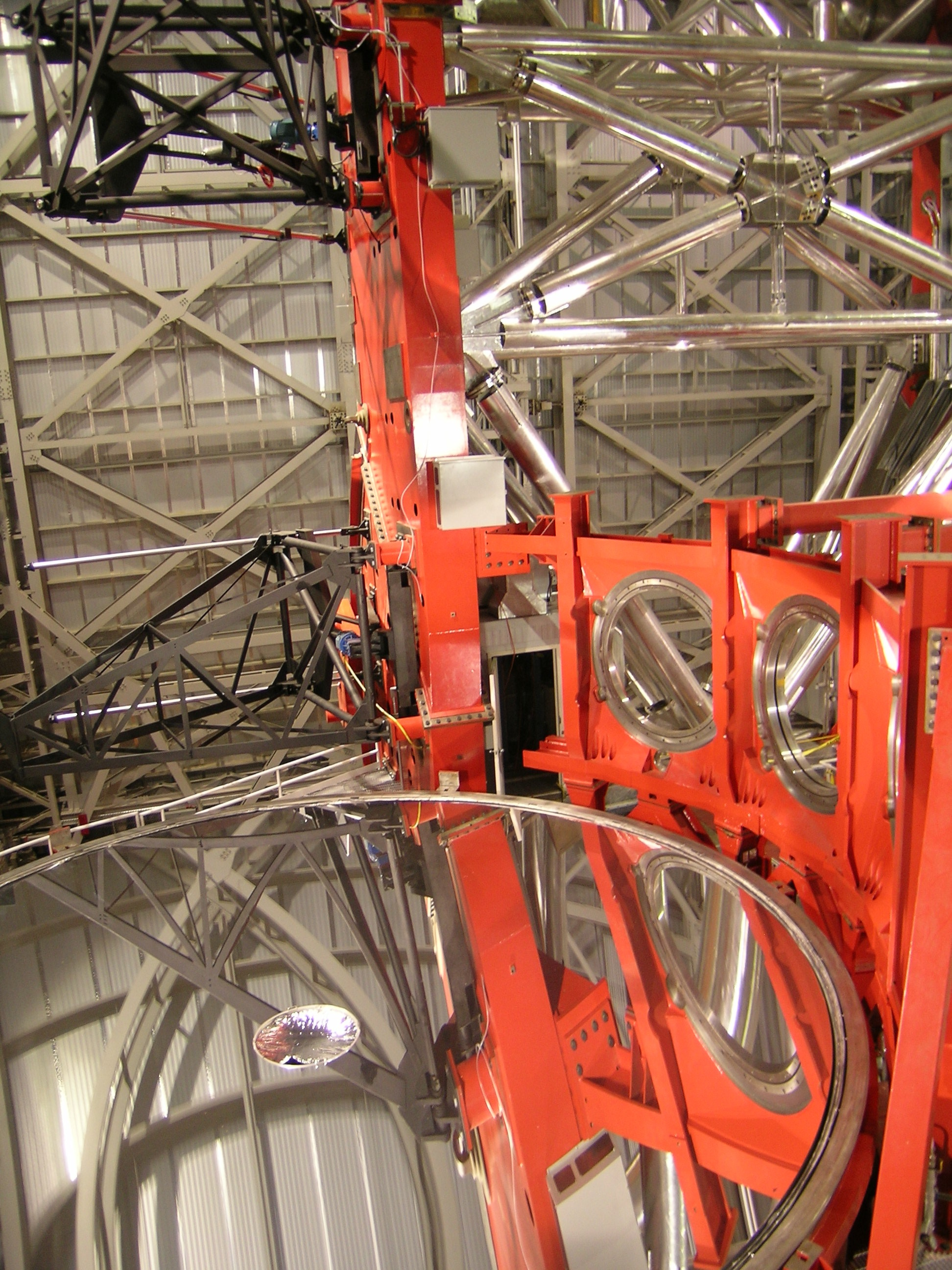
The largest non-segmented mirror in an optical telescope in 2009, one of the Large Binocular Telescope's two mirrors.

A primary mirror (or primary) is the principal light-gathering surface (the objective) of a reflecting telescope.

== Description ==
The primary mirror of a reflecting telescope is a spherical, parabolic, or hyperbolic shaped disks of polished reflective metal (speculum metal up to the mid 19th century), or in later telescopes, glass or other material coated with a reflective layer. One of the first known reflecting telescopes, Newton's reflector of 1668, used a 3.3 cm polished metal primary mirror. The next major change was to use silver on glass rather than metal, in the 19th century such was with the Crossley reflector. This was changed to vacuum deposited aluminum on glass, used on the 200-inch Hale telescope.

Solid primary mirrors have to sustain their own weight and not deform under gravity, which limits the maximum size for a single piece primary mirror.

Segmented mirror configurations are used to get around the size limitation on single primary mirrors. For example, the Giant Magellan Telescope will have seven 8.4 meter primary mirrors, with the resolving power equivalent to a 24.5 m (80.4 ft) optical aperture.

== Superlative primary mirrors ==
The largest optical telescope in the world as of 2009 to use a non-segmented single-mirror as its primary mirror is the 8.2 m (27 ft) Subaru telescope of the National Astronomical Observatory of Japan, located in Mauna Kea Observatory on Hawaii since 1997; however, this is not the largest diameter single mirror in a telescope, the U.S./German/Italian Large Binocular Telescope has two 8.4 m (28 ft) mirrors (which can be used together for interferometric mode). Both of these are smaller than the 10 m segmented primary mirrors on the dual Keck telescope. The Hubble Space Telescope has a 2.4 metres (7 feet 10 inches) primary mirror.

Radio and submillimeter telescopes use much larger dishes or antennae, which do not have to be made as precisely as the mirrors used in optical telescopes. The Arecibo Telescope used a 305 m dish, which was the world largest single-dish radio telescope fixed to the ground. The Green Bank Telescope has the world's largest steerable single radio dish with 100 m in diameter. There are larger radio arrays, composed of multiple dishes which have better image resolution but less sensitivity.

== See also ==
- Active optics
- Honeycomb mirror
- Liquid-mirror telescope
- List of largest optical reflecting telescopes
- List of telescope parts and construction
- Mirror mount
- Mirror support cell
- Secondary mirror
- Silvering
