= Malcolm Knapp Research Forest =

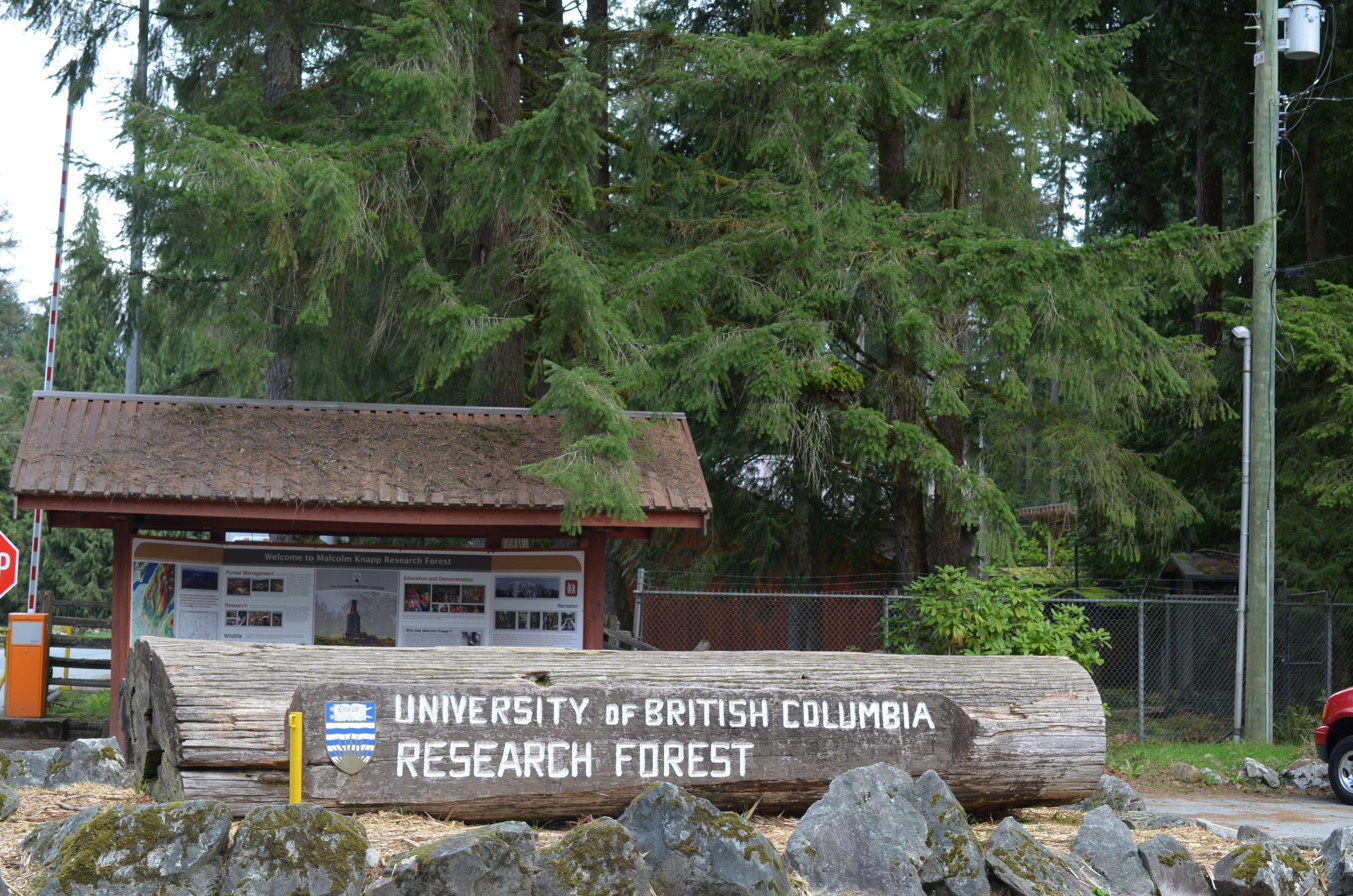
- Interactive map of Malcolm Knapp Research Forest
- Type: Research forest
- Location: Maple Ridge, Canada
- Coordinates: 49.31°N 122.57°W
- Area: 5,157 hectares (12,740 acres)
- Created: 1949
- Operator: University of British Columbia

The Malcolm Knapp Research Forest is located in the Coast Mountains, about 60 km from Vancouver, in Maple Ridge, British Columbia. The forest is approximately 5,157 hectares (12,743 acres) and has many different types of terrain. The forest is home to some trees 400+ years old, though the vast majority of trees are 70–120 years old.

It was a site of major logging from the 1800s through to 1931, but was officially established as the UBC Malcolm Knapp Research Forest in 1949 in recognition of major influence from the late UBC professor Malcolm Knapp, who was the first Registered Professional Forester in British Columbia. Although today it is dedicated to research and education, it is also a popular destination for public day-use trail hiking.

== Historic influence and UBC research ==
In 1922 when the forestry program at UBC was just two years old, Malcolm Knapp, a professor of forestry, had a vision to conduct research for forestry. He taught courses on logging, wood technology and forestry products. At this time, the university only had a small forest for research, located on the edge of the UBC campus in Point Grey.

When the University of British Columbia took over management of the forest in 1949, Knapp's vision of having a large and vast forest dedicated to forestry operations and research became a reality. This vision, along with his passion for salvaging and silviculture for the Forestry Program at UBC, was of great importance as his 41 years of service for the university ended in 1963. After his many years of service to the forest and the university, the Research Forest officially changed its name to the UBC Malcolm Knapp Research Forest in 1988.

There are over 1,000 research projects to date that have taken place at the forest; most are related to riparian management, silviculture, wildlife, hydrology, ecology, and other applied science fields.

== Ecology ==
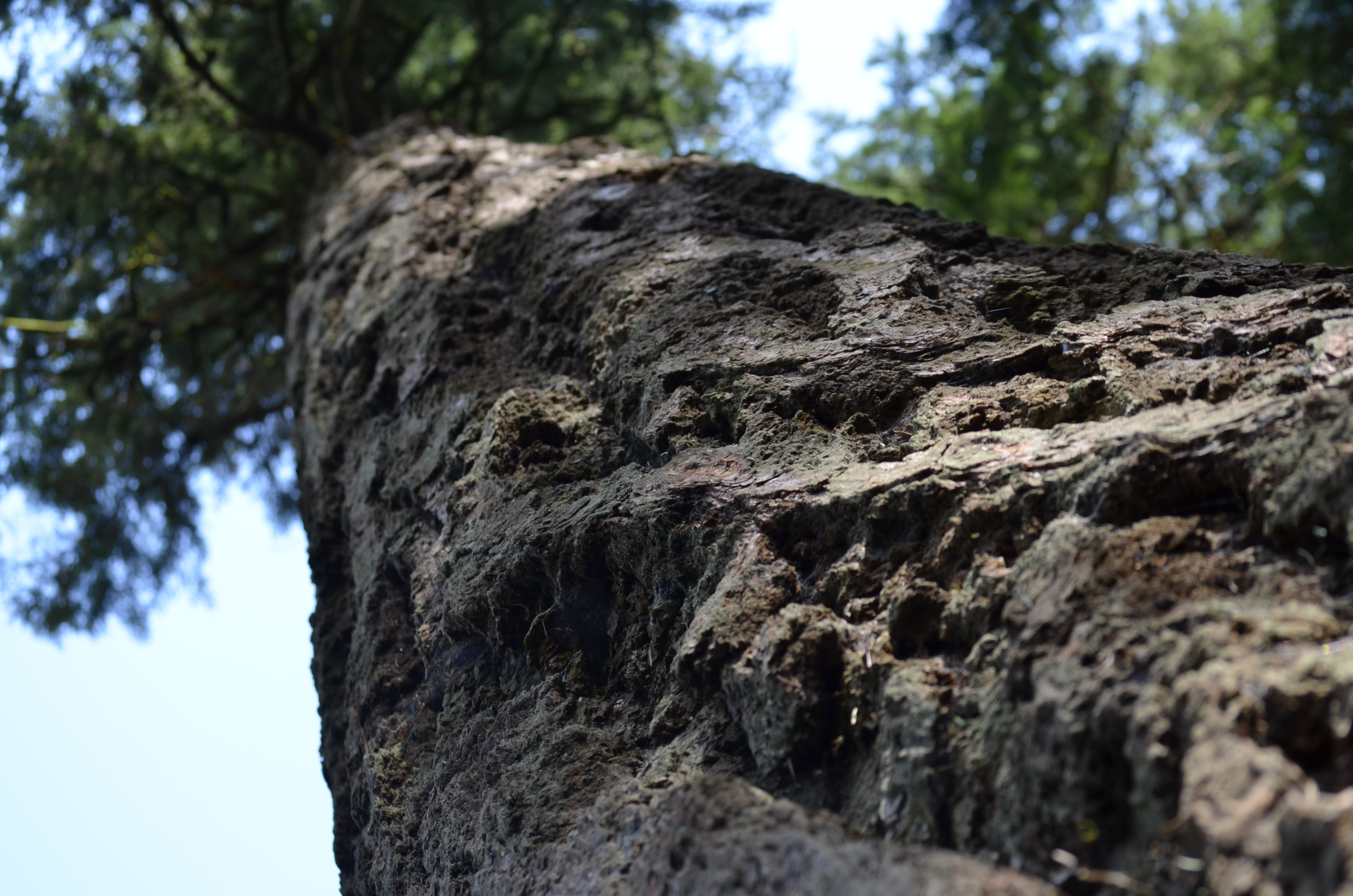

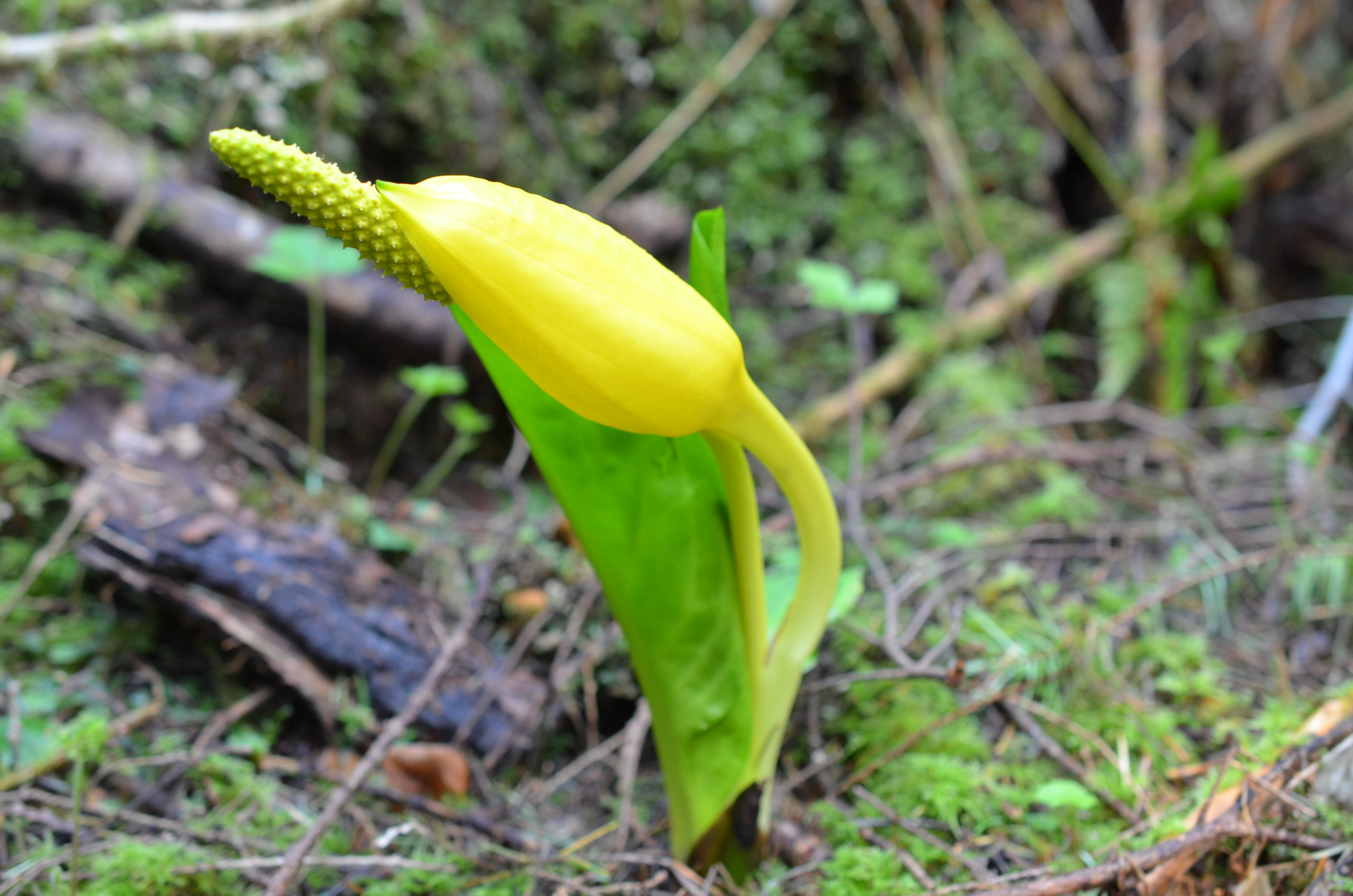

The forest is about 5,157 hectares (12,740 acres). It contains every type of terrain found on Coastal B.C, meaning it has a wide variety of many plants, animals and trees. The highest elevation is in the north-east corner and is about 1000m above sea level, and it spans down to sea level, touching Pitt Lake. Typically, the most precipitation that is seen at the forest is rain, which averages about 2200mm in the northern end of the forest. This end also receives snow in the winter. However, the south end of the forest is closer to sea level and receives around 3000mm of rain per year.

Malcolm Knapp Research Forest is categorized in the Coast Western Hemlock Biogeoclimatic zone, with the lower portion of the forest in the dry maritime subzone and the upper portion in the very wet maritime subzone. It has a vast collection of trees, plants and animals including Douglas fir, western red cedar, western hemlock and amabilis fir trees. The forest still has some patches of intact old growth forest that is over 400 years old. Some other trees and plants found in the forest are bigleaf maple, vine maple, skunk cabbage (yellow flower pictured beside), Oregon grape, salmonberry, and many ferns like sword fern and spiny wood fern.

== Recreation ==
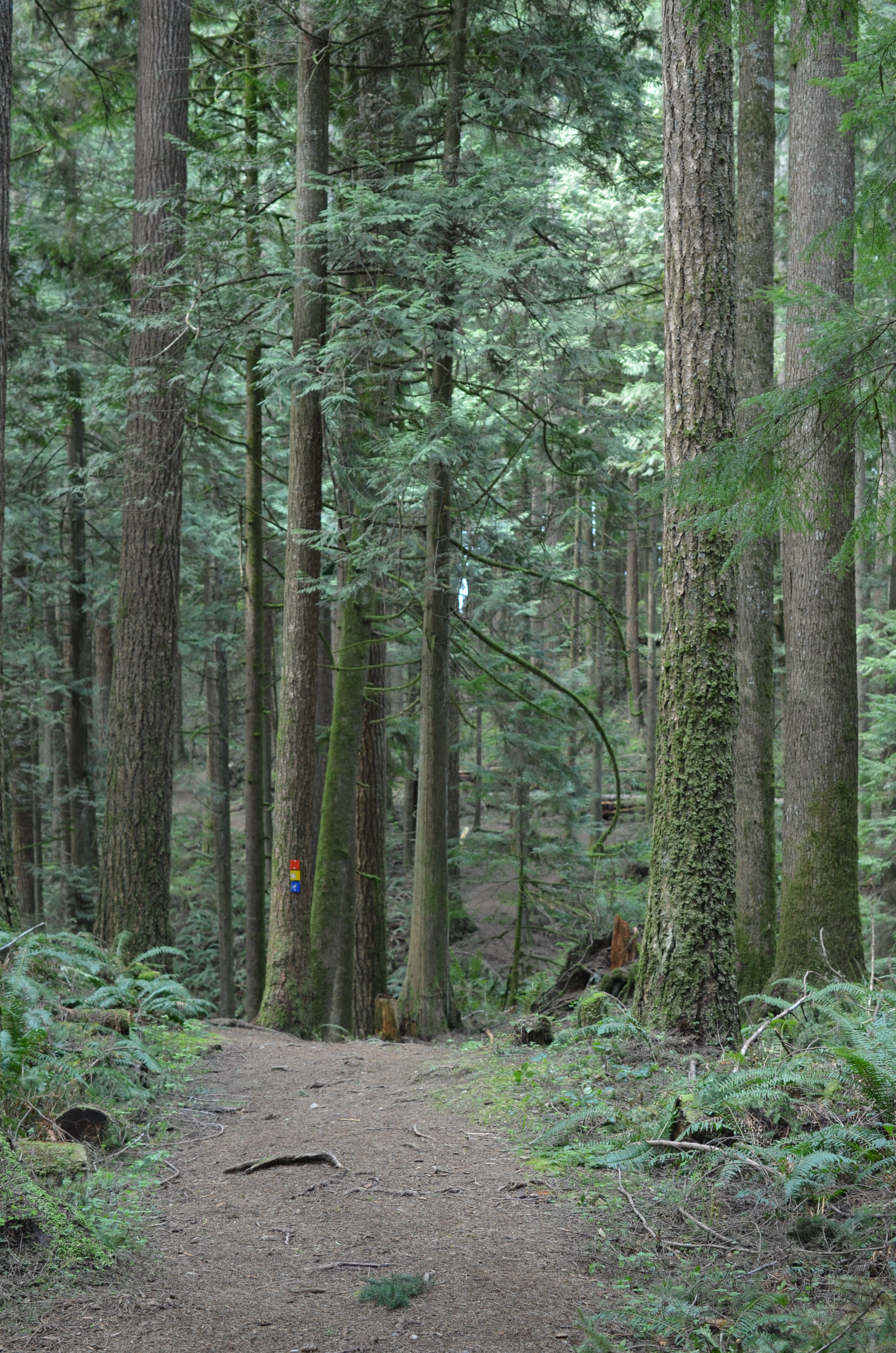

The maximum trail length is about 8 km; that will take the average hiker around 2.5 hours to walk. The trails at Malcolm Knapp are categorized as an intermediate hike.

=== South Malcolm Knapp hiking ===
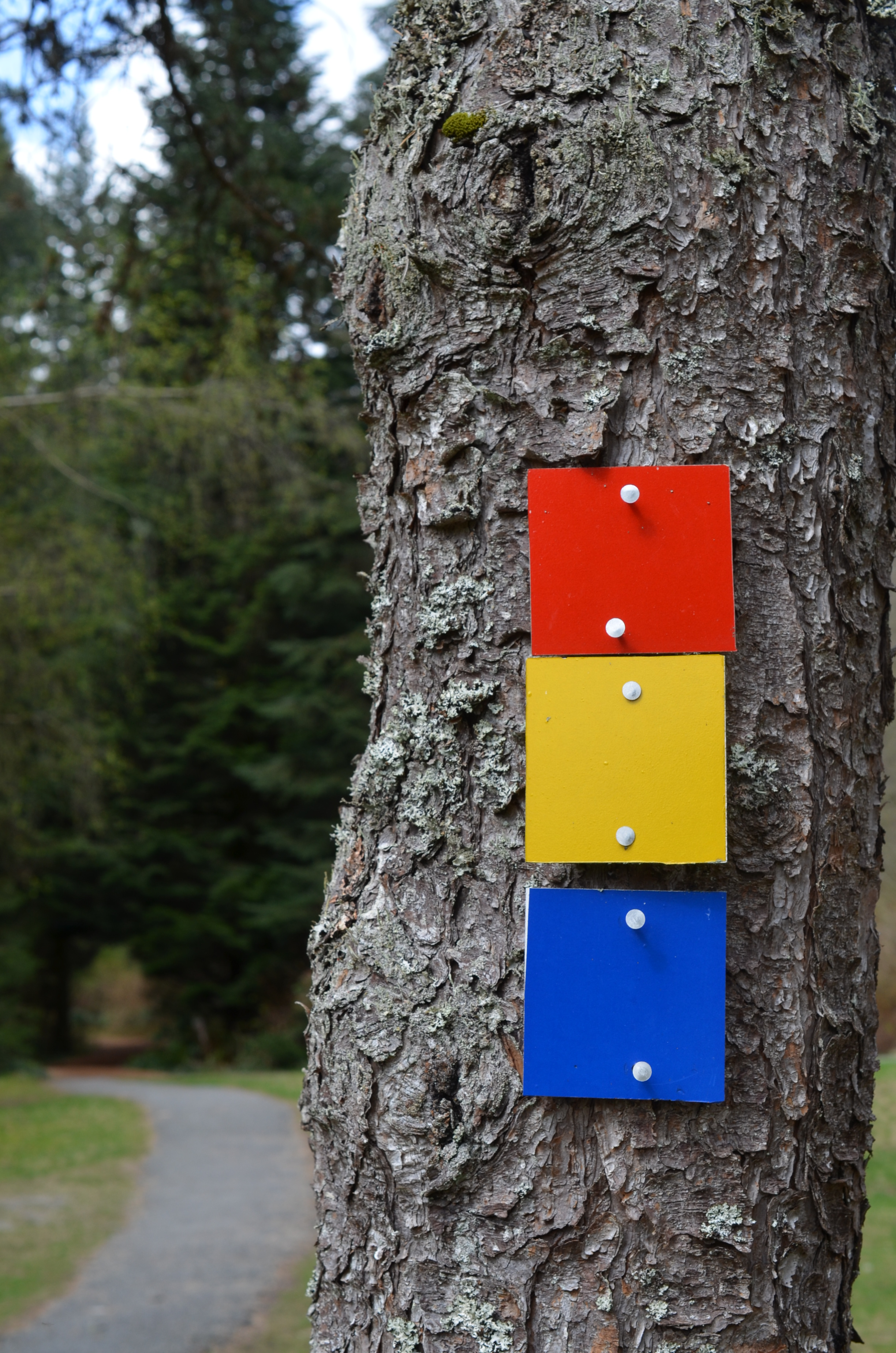

The south part of Malcolm Knapp Research Forest has an abundance of trails which are all colour coded into Red, Green, Yellow, and Blue, with red being the easiest and Blue being the longest and most difficult terrain. Please see external links for a map of the trails.

=== Loon Lake hiking ===
The Loon Lake Trail is for guests of Loon Lake Lodge & Retreat Centre who wish to embark on this 6 km hike. This trail system is only open to guests of Loon Lake and not the general public.

==== Loon Lake Research and Education Centre ====
Loon Lake Lodge & Retreat Centre offers corporate retreats, wellness weekends and youth school groups in a nature-based destination.

- Canoe & Water Adventures
- Hiking
- Inspired Learning educational programs
- Customized team-building activities

==== Camp Goodtimes ====
Loon Lake also houses Camp Goodtimes, a summer recreation program for children and teens affected by cancer and their families. It is divided into six weeks throughout July and August: four weeks for kids' camp, one week for teen, and one week for family. It is held at Loon Lake at no cost to participants. Camp Goodtimes is accredited by the British Columbia Camping Association and the Canadian Association of Pediatric Oncology Camps (CAPOC).

== See also ==
- Pacific Spirit Regional Park, operated by MetroVancouver and separates UBC from the City of Vancouver
- Alex Fraser Research Forest, another one of UBC's research forests
- Alouette Lake, a lake near Malcolm Knapp Forest
- Large Zenith Telescope, a former liquid mirror telescope in the Malcolm Knapp Forest
