= Aryabhatta Research Institute of Observational Sciences =

Research institute in Nainital, India

Aryabhatta Research Institute of Observational Sciences (ARIES)
- आर्यभट्ट प्रेक्षण विज्ञान शोध संस्थान
- Established: 20 April 1954; 72 years ago
- Field of research: Astronomy, Solar Physics, Astrophysics and Atmospheric Science
- Director: Dr.Manish Naja
- Location: Manora Peak, Nainital, Uttarakhand, 263001, India; 29.359°N 79.458°E
- Website: www.aries.res.in

Map
- Location within Uttarakhand Location within India

Aryabhatta Research Institute of Observational Sciences (ARIES) is a research institute in Nainital, Uttarakhand, India which specializes in astronomy, solar physics, astrophysics and atmospheric science. It is an autonomous body under the Department of Science and Technology, Government of India. The institute is situated at Manora Peak (elevation 1,951 m or 6,401 ft), about 9 kilometres (5.6 mi) from Nainital, headquarters of Kumaon division.

The astronomical observatory is open to the public on afternoons, and on occasional moonlit nights with prior permission.

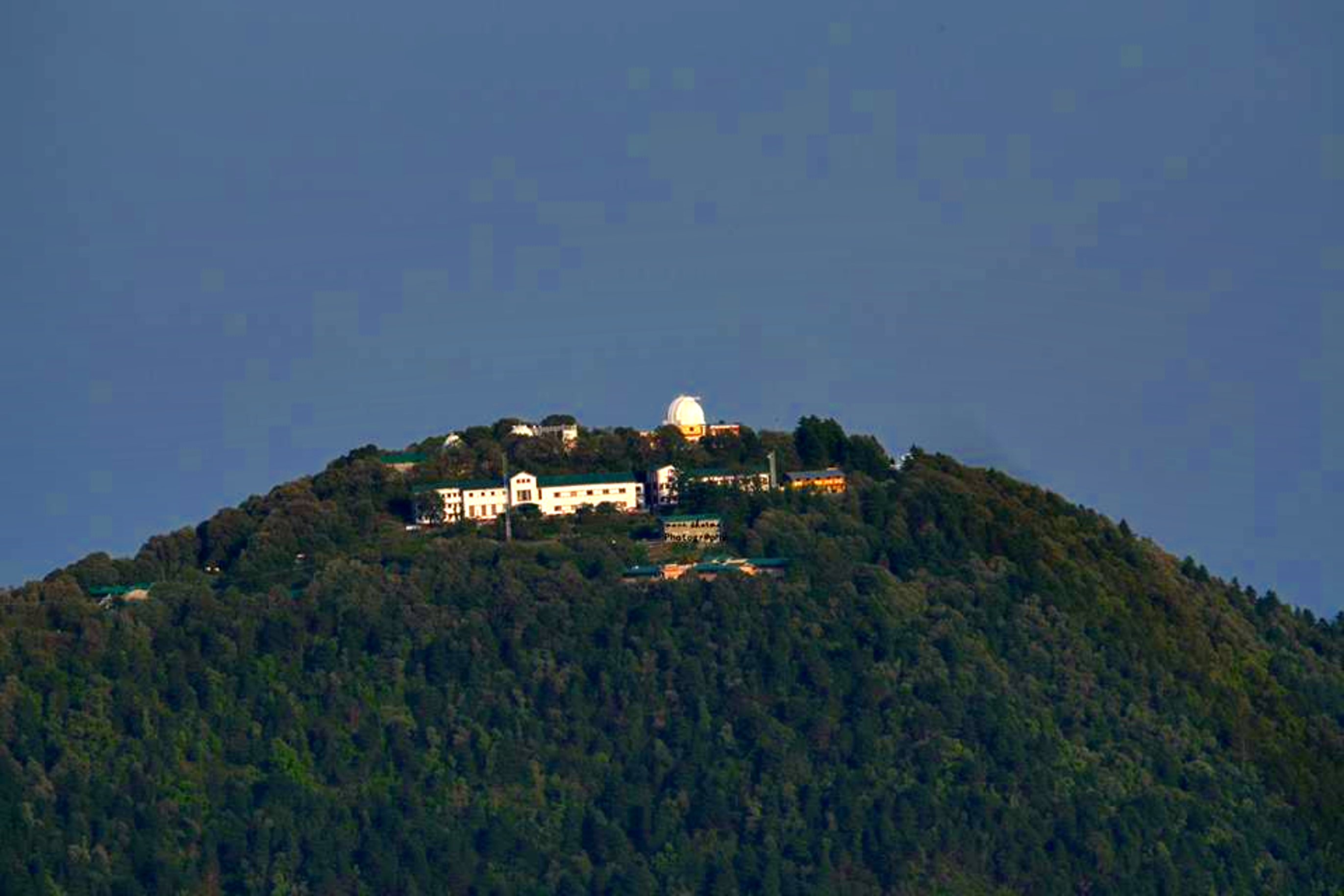
Aryabhatta Research Institute of Observational Sciences

== History ==
The institute was started on 20 April 1954 under the supervision of Dr. A. N. Singh as Uttar Pradesh State Observatory (UPSO) in the premises of the Government Sanskrit College, presently known as Sampurnanand Sanskrit Vishwavidyalaya, Varanasi, Uttar Pradesh. With the formation of the State of Uttarakhand on 9 November 2000, and because of its geographical location within the boundaries of Uttarakhand, UPSO came under the administrative control of the Government of Uttarakhand and was re-christened as the State Observatory (SO). The institute was named as Aryabhatta Research Institute of Observational Sciences (ARIES) when it came under the Department of Science & Technology (DST), Government of India as an autonomous body on 22 March 2004.

== Site ==
ARIES has 32.38 hectares (80.0 acres) of land at Manora Peak, Nainital on which functional and residential buildings are located. An additional 4.48 hectares (11.1 acres) has been acquired at Devasthal, nearly 50 kilometres (31 mi) away by road, for new observational facilities. The site has about 200 clear nights in a year and the median ground level seeing is about 1".

== Research facilities ==
=== Astronomy and Astrophysics ===
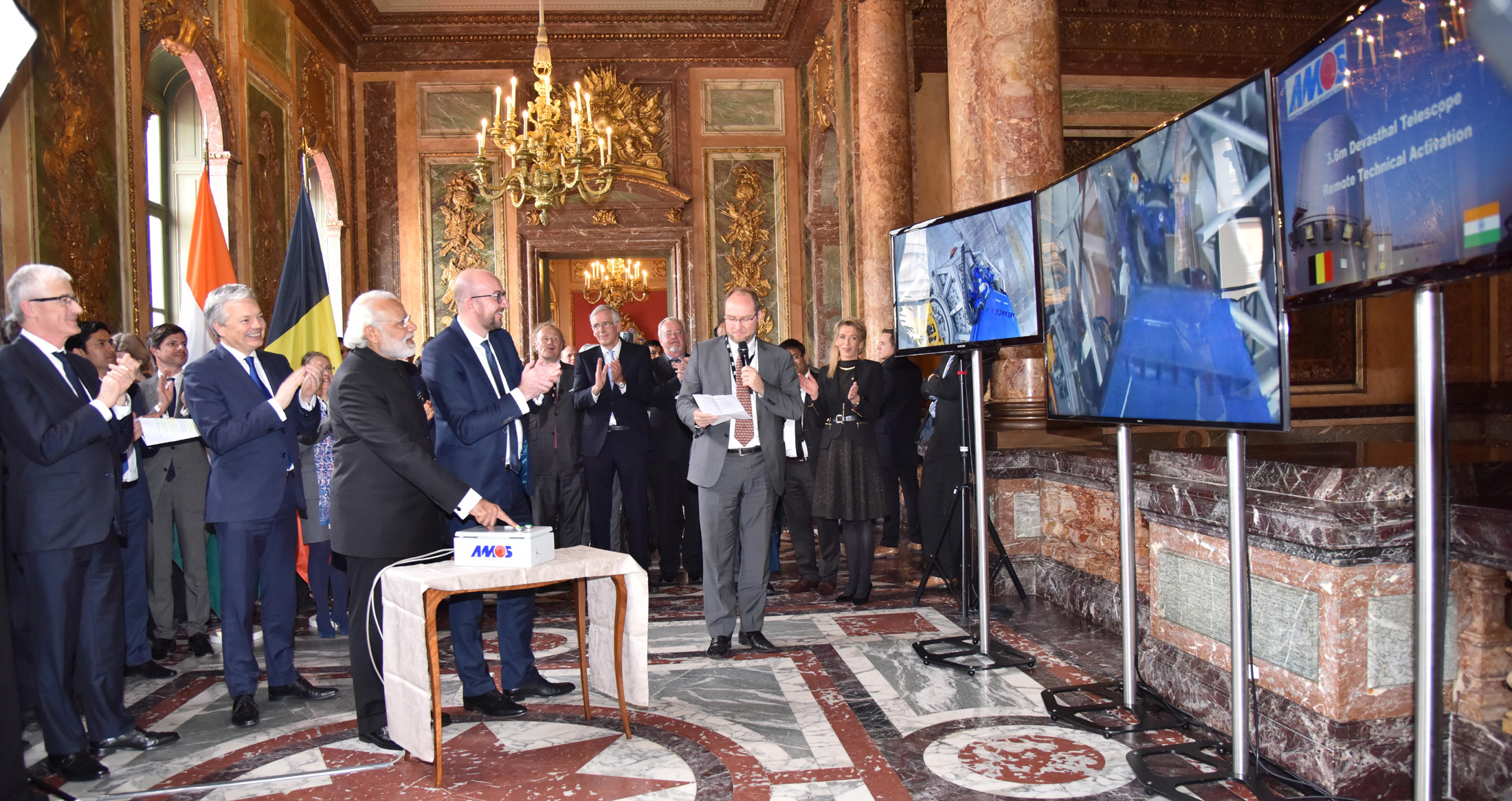
Prime Minister Narendra Modi and Belgian Prime Minister Charles Michel remotely activate the ARIES telescope from Brussels on 30 March 2016.

Research activities at ARIES cover topics related to the sun, stars and galaxies. ARIES has made significant contributions particularly to the field of star clusters and gamma-ray bursts (GRBs). The longitude of ARIES (79° East) locates it in the middle of a 180-degree wide longitude band having modern astronomical facilities lying between the Canary Islands (20° West) and Eastern Australia (157° East). Therefore, observations which are not possible in the Canary Islands or Australia due to daylight can be made at ARIES. Because of its geographical location, ARIES has made contributions to many areas of astronomical research, particularly those involving time-critical phenomena (e.g., the first successful attempt in the country to observe optical afterglow of GRBs was carried out from ARIES). Many eclipsing binaries, variable stars, star clusters, nearby galaxies, GRBs, and supernovas have been observed from ARIES.

The other research fields of the institute include solar astronomy, stellar astronomy, star clusters, stellar variability and pulsation, photometric studies of nearby galaxies, quasars, and transient events like supernovas and highly energetic gamma-ray bursts. A total solar eclipse lasting about 4 minutes was successfully observed from Manavgat, Antalya in Turkey on 29 March 2006 by a team of scientists from ARIES.

In past, new ring systems around Saturn, Uranus, and Neptune were discovered from the observatory. Recently, a direct correlation between the intra-night optical variability and the degree of polarization of the radio jets in quasars was established based on the observations from ARIES. For the first time periodic oscillations are detected in optical intra-day variability data of blazars, which is useful to get the black hole mass of blazars, and also provide support to accretion disk–based models of AGNs.

=== Atmospheric Sciences ===
Nainital is located at a high altitude in the central Himalayas and away from cities or other major pollution sources. This makes it suitable for carrying out observations on background conditions and for studying the regional environment, particularly interactions between natural and anthropogenic trace species and climate change. Additionally, the ARIES site can also provide information on long range transport of pollutants. Studies on lower atmospheric dynamics are also very important in this region, which is severely lacking over northern India.

== Infrastructure ==
The Institute has in-house workshops to meet the requirements of electronic, mechanical, and optical maintenance of the instruments. ARIES has a modern computer center with Internet and a library with more than 10,000 volumes of research journals and a collection of books on astronomy, astrophysics and atmospheric science.

== Facilities ==
- 3.6m Devasthal Optical Telescope
- 1.3m Devasthal Optical Telescope
- 104 cm Sampurnanand Telescope
- Solar Telescope
- 4m International Liquid Mirror Telescope (ILMT)
- Baker-Nunn Schmidt Telescope (BNST)
- Stratosphere Troposphere Radar

== See also ==
- Astrotourism in India
- List of planetariums
- Devasthal Observatory
- List of astronomical observatories
