= Mercury silvering =

Metalworking technique

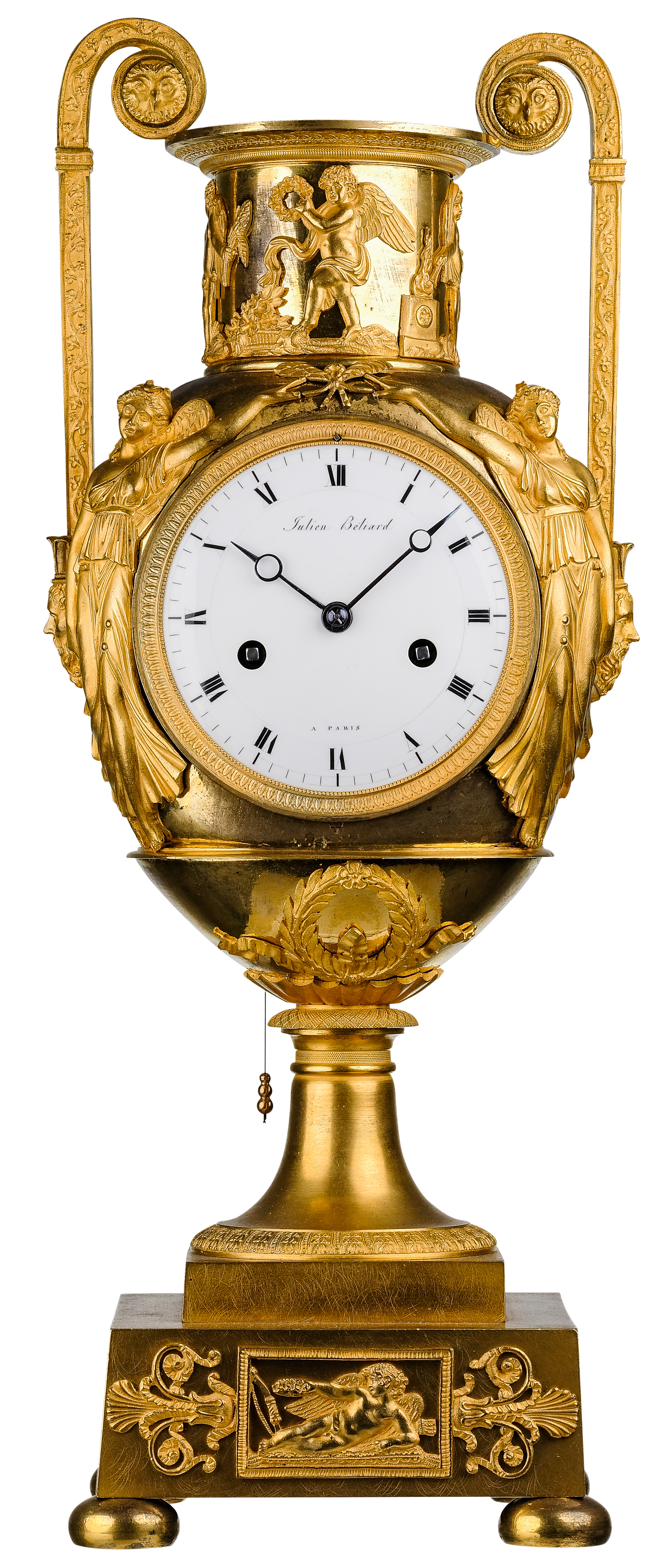
French ormolu mantel clock (around 1800) by Julien Béliard (born 1758 – died after 1806), Paris. The clock case by Claude Galle (1758–1815).

Mercury silvering or fire gilding is a silvering technique for applying a thin layer of precious metal such as silver or gold (mercury gilding) to a base metal object. The process was invented during the renaissance and is documented in Vannoccio Biringuccio's 1540 book De la pirotechnia. An amalgam of mercury and the precious metal is prepared and applied to the object which is then heated, sometimes in oil, vaporizing most of the mercury. The technique is dangerous since mercury is highly toxic, especially in its vapor phase. Mercury silvering can be detected through a variety of methods.

The technique was also used in Asia, for example tokin plating in Edo-period Japan.

== See also ==
- Mercury glass, internally silvered decorative glass products named for their resemblance to mercury
- Liquid-mirror telescope, may use a layer of reflective mercury
