= Silvering =

Application of reflective coatings to mirrors

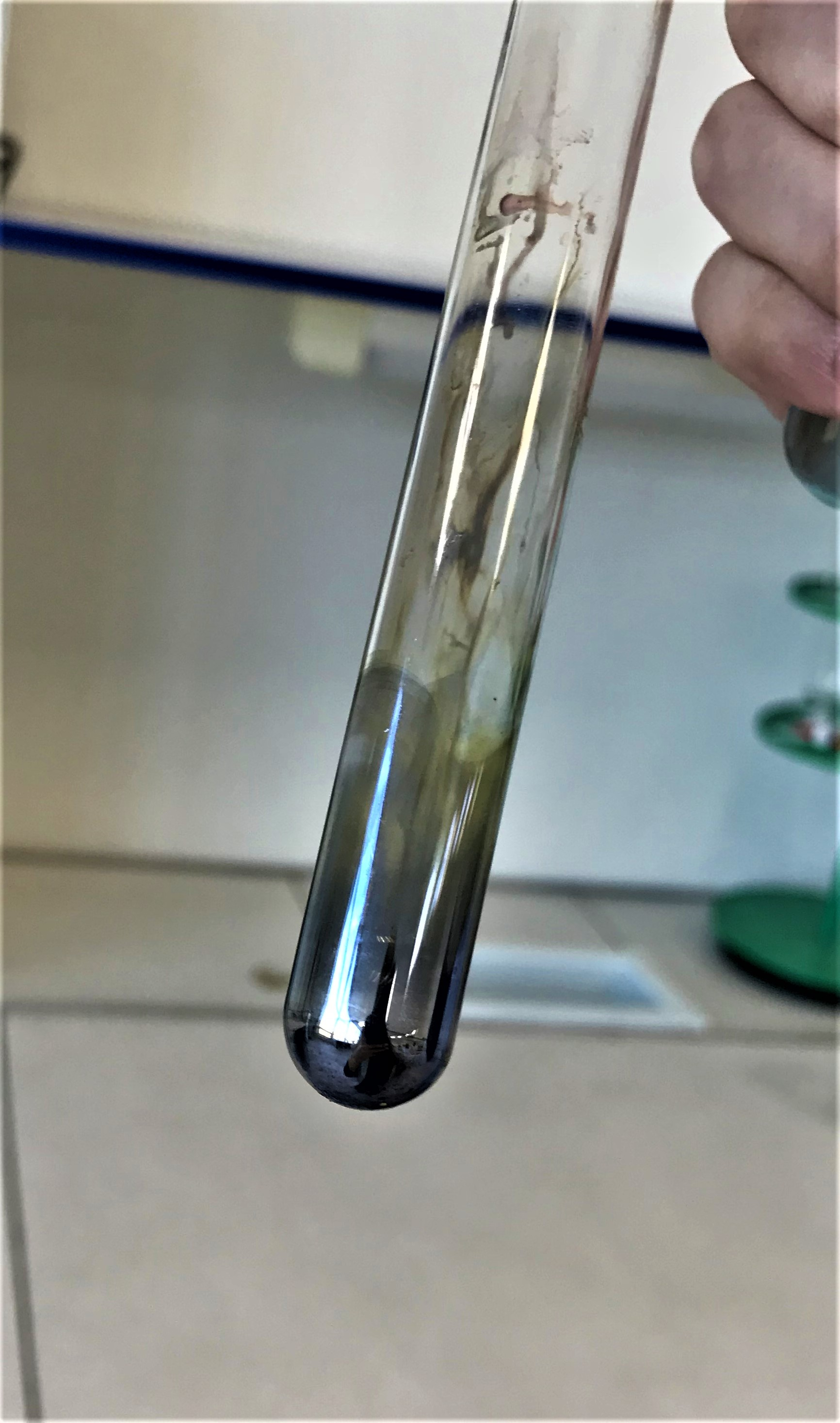
Silvering on the inside of a glass test tube

Silvering is the chemical process of coating a non-conductive substrate such as glass with a reflective substance, to produce a mirror. While the metal is often silver, the term is used for the application of any reflective metal.

== Process ==
Most common household mirrors are "back-silvered" or "second-surface", meaning that the light reaches the reflective layer after passing through the glass. A protective layer of paint is usually applied to protect the back side of the reflective surface. This arrangement protects the fragile reflective layer from corrosion, scratches, and other damage. However, the glass layer may absorb some of the light and cause distortions and optical aberrations due to refraction at the front surface, and multiple additional reflections on it, giving rise to "ghost images" (although some optical mirrors such as Mangin mirrors take advantage of it).

Therefore, precision optical mirrors normally are "front-silvered" or "first-surface", meaning that the reflective layer is on the surface towards the incoming light. The substrate normally provides only physical support, and need not be transparent. A hard, protective, transparent overcoat may be applied to prevent oxidation of the reflective layer and scratching of the metal. Front-coated mirrors achieve reflectivities of 90–95% when new.

== History ==
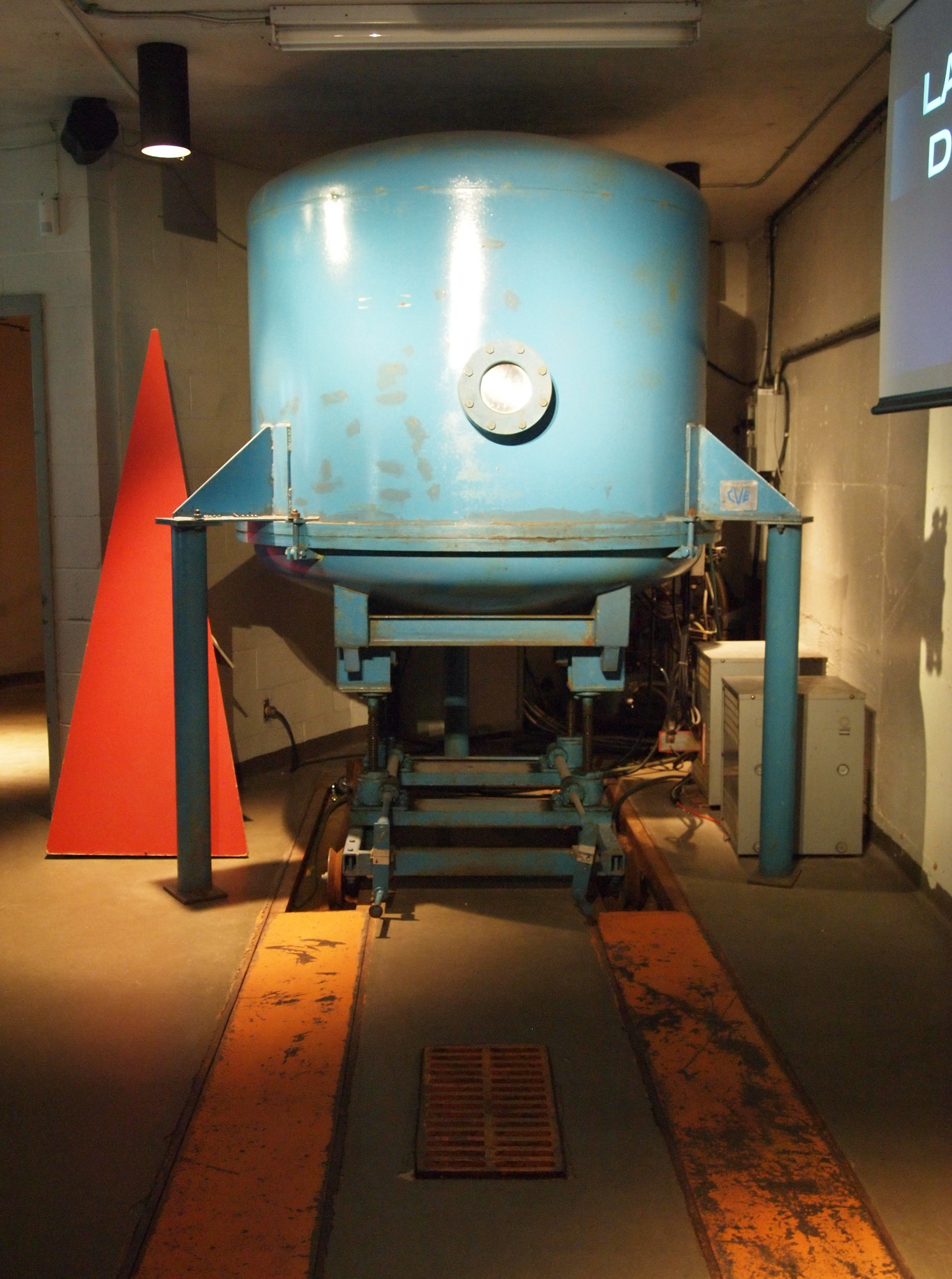
Aluminising tank at Mont Mégantic Observatory used for re-coating telescope mirrors.

Ptolemaic Egypt had manufactured small glass mirrors backed by lead, tin, or antimony. In the early 10th century, the Persian scientist al-Razi described ways of silvering and gilding in a book on alchemy, but this was not done for the purpose of making mirrors.

Tin-coated mirrors were first made in Europe in the 15th century. The thin tinfoil used to silver mirrors was known as "tain". When glass mirrors first gained widespread usage in Europe during the 16th century, most were silvered with an amalgam of tin and mercury.

In 1835 German chemist Justus von Liebig developed a process for depositing silver on the rear surface of a piece of glass; this technique gained wide acceptance after Liebig improved it in 1856. The process was further refined and made easier by the chemist Tony Petitjean (1856). This reaction is a variation of the Tollens' reagent for aldehydes. A solution of diamminesilver(I) is mixed with a sugar and sprayed onto the glass surface. Silver(I) oxidizes the sugar, reducing itself to silver(0), i.e. elemental silver, which deposits onto the glass.

In 1856-1857 Karl August von Steinheil and Léon Foucault introduced the process of depositing an ultra-thin layer of silver on the front surface of a piece of glass, making the first optical-quality first-surface glass mirrors, replacing the use of speculum metal mirrors in reflecting telescopes. These techniques soon became standard for technical equipment.

An aluminum vacuum-deposition process invented in 1930 by Caltech physicist and astronomer John Strong, led to most reflecting telescopes shifting to aluminum. Nevertheless, some modern telescopes use silver, such as the Kepler Space Telescope. The Kepler mirror's silver was deposited using ion-assisted evaporation.

== Modern silvering processes ==
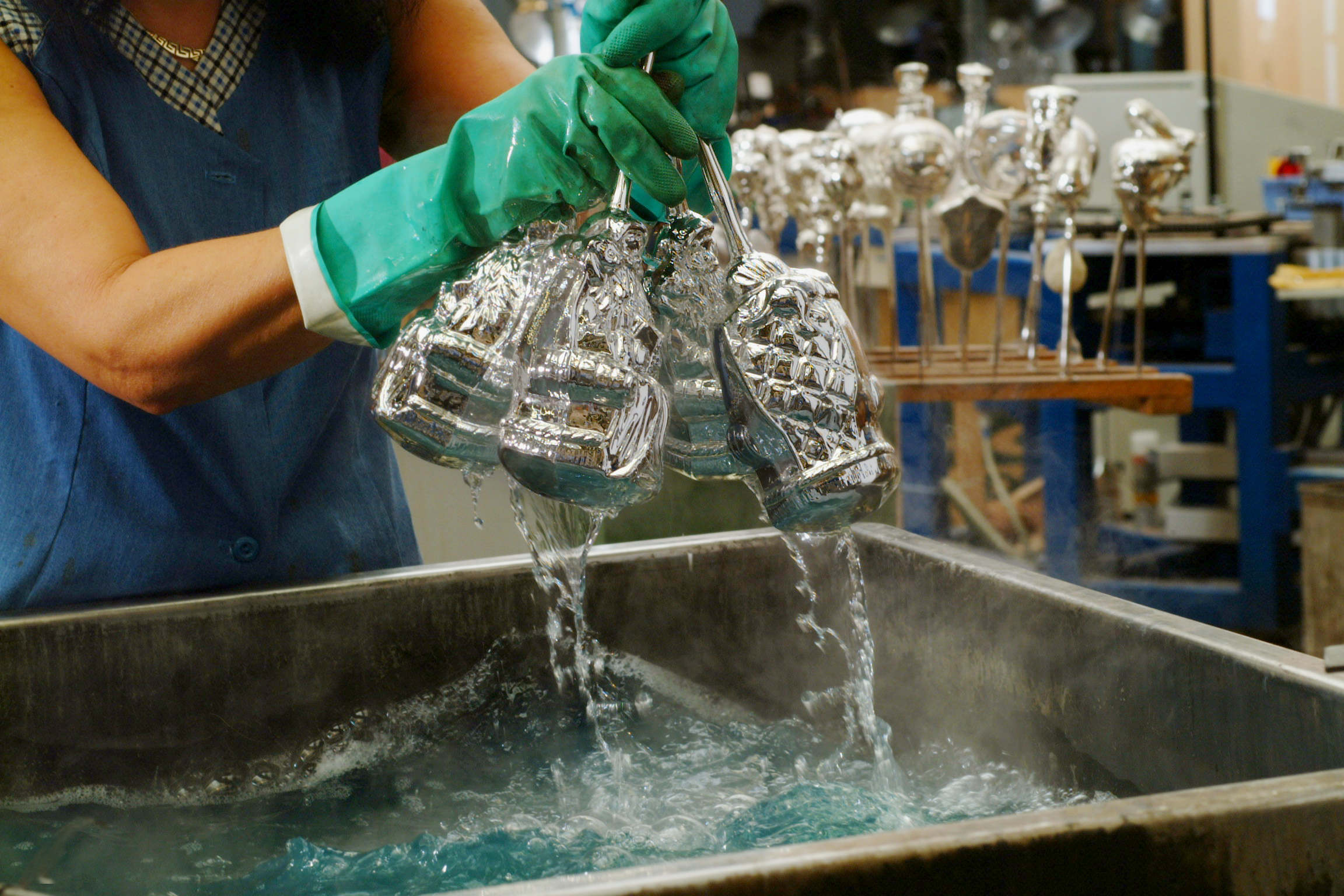
To speed up the reaction process of the silver, the ornaments are shaken in hot water, Lauscha

=== General processes ===
Silvering aims to produce a non-crystalline coating of amorphous metal (metallic glass), with no visible artifacts from grain boundaries. The most common methods in current use are electroplating, chemical "wet process" deposition, and vacuum deposition.

Electroplating of a substrate of glass or other non-conductive material requires the deposition of a thin layer of conductive but transparent material, such as carbon. This layer tends to reduce the adhesion between the metal and the substrate. Chemical deposition can result in better adhesion, directly or by pre-treatment of the surface.

Vacuum deposition can produce very uniform coating with very precisely controlled thickness.

=== Metals ===
==== Silver ====
The reflective layer on a second-surface mirror such as a household mirror is often actual silver. A modern "wet" process for silver coating treats the glass with tin(II) chloride to improve the bonding between silver and glass. An activator is applied after the silver has been deposited to harden the tin and silver coatings. A layer of copper may be added for long-term durability.

Silver would be ideal for telescope mirrors and other demanding optical applications, since it has the best initial front-surface reflectivity in the visible spectrum. However, it quickly oxidizes and absorbs atmospheric sulfur to create a dark, low-reflectivity tarnish.

==== Aluminum ====
The "silvering" on precision optical instruments such as telescopes is usually aluminum. Although aluminum also oxidizes quickly, the thin aluminum oxide (sapphire) layer is transparent, and so the high-reflectivity underlying aluminum stays visible.

In modern aluminum silvering, a sheet of glass is placed in a vacuum chamber with electrically heated nichrome coils that can evaporate aluminum. In a vacuum, the hot aluminum atoms travel in straight lines. When they hit the surface of the mirror, they cool and stick.

Some mirror makers evaporate a layer of quartz or beryllia on the mirror; others expose it to pure oxygen or air in an oven so that it will form a tough, clear layer of aluminum oxide.

==== Tin ====
The first tin-coated glass mirrors were produced by applying a tin–mercury amalgam to the glass and then heating the piece to evaporate the mercury.

==== Gold ====
The "silvering" on infrared instruments is usually gold. It has the best reflectivity in the infrared spectrum, and has high resistance to oxidation and corrosion. Conversely, a thin gold coating is used to create optical filters which block infrared (by reflecting it) while passing visible light.

== See also ==
- Dielectric mirror
- List of telescope parts and construction
- Optical coating
- Mercury glass
- Mercury silvering
- Metallizing
