= Liquid-mirror space telescope =

Space telescope which uses a reflective liquid

A liquid-mirror space telescope is a concept for a reflecting space telescope that uses a reflecting liquid such as mercury as its primary reflector.

== Design ==
There are several designs for such a telescope:

- Twirled pail: A pair of objects, one the mirror assembly and the other a counterweight possibly containing a camera assembly, are spun up to induce centripetal acceleration on the surface of the mirror assembly.
- Half toroid: A hollow torus is spun up to maintain centripetal acceleration against the inside wall. The camera assembly sits in the center. The torus width is arbitrarily large. Optional other pieces include a large flat mirror in the center to allow randomly orienting the mirror without frequently changing the axis of spin.
- Balloon: A balloon with a reflective liquid on the inside is spun up and deforms itself into a parabolic shape. A flat mirror on the inside reflects light to the concave surface.
- Continuous-acceleration rocket. A spacecraft is accelerated by an ion thruster or something similar, which produces a constant linear acceleration for a long period of time. The spacecraft carries a rotating liquid mirror, the axis of which is parallel with the direction of acceleration. The spacecraft can be accelerated in any direction, so the mirror can be aimed in any direction.

Regardless of the specific configuration, such a telescope would be similar to an Earth-based liquid-mirror telescope. However, instead of relying on Earth's gravity to maintain the necessary parabolic shape of the rotating mercury mirror, it relies on artificial gravity instead.

Other possibilities for inducing a parabolic shape in the reflecting liquid include:

- magnetic fields on a viscous and partially magnetic liquid;
- internal pressures or surface tension effects on a reflective liquid;
- creating the telescope while the reflective surface is liquid, but depending on cooling effects to solidify the surface and then using that as the telescope main mirror.

The concept is seen as an enabler of very large optical space telescopes, as a liquid mirror would be much cheaper to construct than a conventional glass mirror of comparable performance.

== History ==
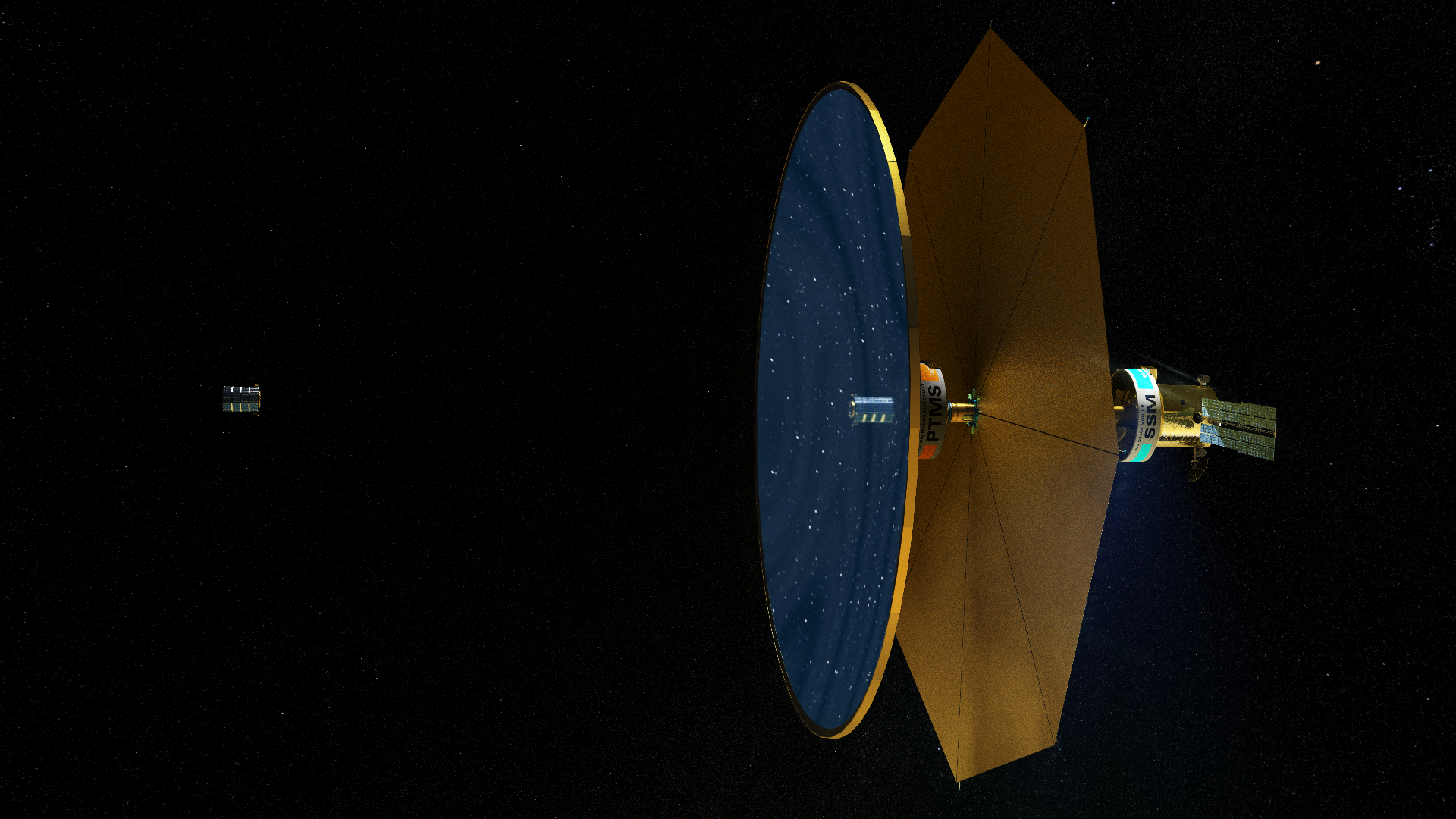
Artist's impression of FLUTE

In April 2022, NASA reported that they would conduct the Fluidic Telescope Experiment (FLUTE) in the ISS, which would be part of the Axiom Mission 1 astronaut Eytan Stibbe's research portfolio. The research would test liquid lens by using water injected by polymers in microgravity through utilizing buoyancy to even gravitational forces and cause weightlessness, to be later hardened by UV light or temperature in-orbit.

A 2025 study by the Technion in Israel concluded that while maneuvering the telescope to point at different points in space will cause tiny ripples on the surface of the mirror, the effect would be very slow, and the inner 80% of the aperture will still be optically functional even after 10 years of regular operation.
