= Large Zenith Telescope =

Decommissioned liquid mirror telescope in British Columbia

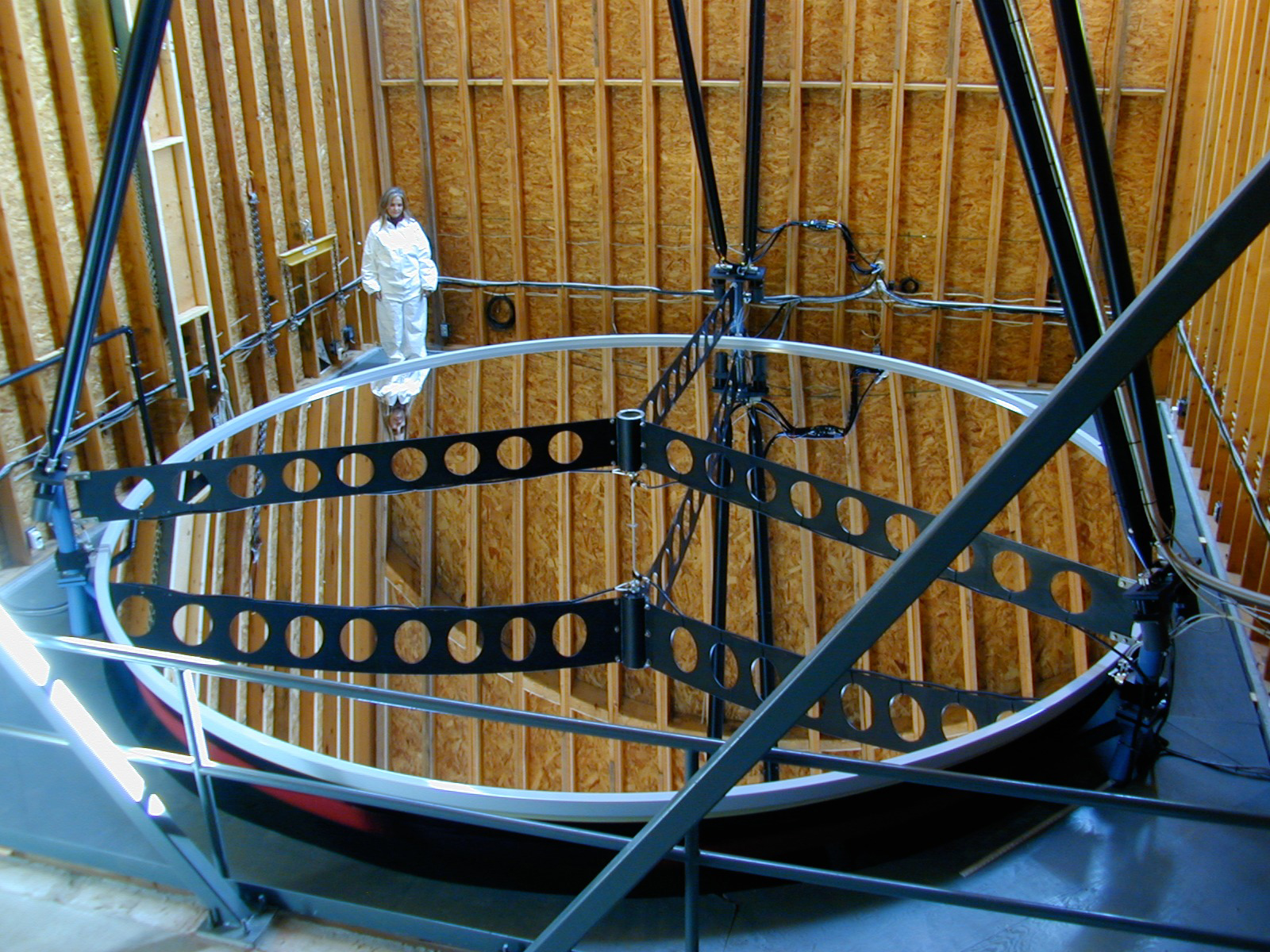
- The Large Zenith Telescope. Notice the size compared to the person at the back.
- Alternative names: LZT
- Location(s): British Columbia, Canada
- Coordinates: 49°17′17″N 122°34′23″W
- Altitude: 395 m (1,296 ft)
- Diameter: 6 m (19 ft 8 in)
- Website: www.astro.ubc.ca/lmt/lzt/
- Location of Large Zenith Telescope
- Related media on Commons

The Large Zenith Telescope (LZT) was a 6.0-meter diameter liquid-mirror telescope located in the University of British Columbia's Malcolm Knapp Research Forest, about 70 km (43 mi) east from Vancouver, British Columbia, Canada (north from Maple Ridge). It was one of the largest optical telescopes in the world, but still quite inexpensive. The telescope was completed in the spring of 2003 and decommissioned in 2016.

== Design ==
Comparison of nominal sizes of primary mirrors of the Large Zenith Telescope and some notable optical telescopes

While a zenith telescope has the disadvantage of not being able to look anywhere but at a small spot straight up, its simplified setup permits the use of a mirror consisting of a smoothly spinning pan filled with liquid mercury. Such a mirror can be made much larger than a conventional mirror, greatly increasing light collecting ability. The LZT is used for transit imaging, meaning that Earth's rotation moves stars along the sensor, and the latent image in the sensor is moved electronically in step with this movement, so that it is read out at the trailing edge.

The telescope made use of parts from the 3-meter diameter NASA Orbital Debris Observatory telescope, which had been using a liquid-mercury mirror for several years.

This mirror was a test, built for $1 million, but it was not suitable for astronomy because of the test site's weather. In 2016 it was noted as the third largest telescope in North America, and for its spinning mercury mirror that cost just 1% of normal mirrors, although it must view upward.

== Decommissioning ==
According to Atlas Obscura the Large Zenith Telescope was decommissioned in the summer of 2016. All of its liquid mercury was stored for other projects.

The website Physics Footnotes also mentioned that the LMT had been decommissioned, but gave no time frame in the undated article.

Science magazine reported in 2019 that the LMT was decommissioned, but was also silent on the date.

== Similar projects ==
The university plans a larger 8-meter liquid-mirror telescope named the Advanced Liquid-Mirror Probe (ALPACA) for astronomical use at an estimated first-light cost of $5 million, $3 million contingency, $10 million for the camera, $5 million for a spectrograph, and $0.3 million operating costs per year.

A larger project is planned, called LAMA, with 66 individual 6.15-meter telescopes with a total collecting power equal to a 55-meter telescope, resolving power of a 70-meter scope.

== See also ==
- List of largest optical reflecting telescopes
- List of the largest optical telescopes in North America
- Lists of telescopes
