= Silvered glass =

Glass with an internal reflective layer

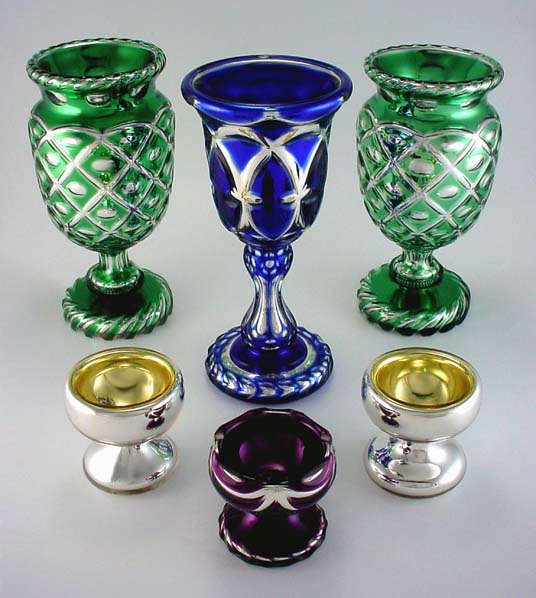
English mercury-glass objects

Silvered glass (sometimes called mercury glass) is a kind of glass used in tableware, gazing balls, Christmas ornaments, and other decorative arts. The technique involves coating the inside of the glass object with a liquid silvering solution and then sealing it. The silvering solution was originally a silver-mercury or tin-mercury amalgam; this was quickly displaced by a less toxic solution of silver nitrate.

The silver coating will deteriorate upon exposure to air, so the hole by which it was poured into the glass must be sealed. A ground glass disk may be used as a seal, but commonly the seal is simply an inexpensive cork hidden under a layer of wax and paper. When silvered glass is used for a vessel such as a drinking glass or vase, the vessel must be blown double-walled, so that the silvering solution is not exposed either on the inside or on the outside of the vessel.

== Techniques ==
Silvered glass, using the mercury-based method, was first produced in Bohemia as early as 1825. By the 1840s and 1850s the mercury method had given way to the silver-nitrate method. Silvered glass from Bohemia was decorated with a variety of techniques, including painting, enameling, etching, and surface engraving. It was intended mainly for export to England, America, and Australia.

Edward Varnish and Frederick Hale Thomson patented a technique for silvering glass vessels in 1849. The double-walled blanks were furnished by James Powell. The English examples were often cased with a layer of colored glass in jewel tones of ruby red, cobalt blue, amethyst purple, and emerald green, then cut to silver, as illustrated in the photograph.

== Commercial history ==
Companies in the United States, including the Boston and Sandwich Glass Company, New England Glass Company, Union Glass Company, and Boston Silver Glass Company, made silvered glass from about 1852 to 1880. The New England Glass Company displayed a variety of silvered glass articles — including wheel-engraved goblets, vases, and other tableware — at the New York Exhibition of the Industry of All Nations in 1853.

Mercury-silvered glass was produced from 1840 until at least 1930 in Bohemia, and was also manufactured in England from 1849 to 1855. Although mercury was originally used to provide the reflective backing for mirrors, elemental mercury was never used to create tableware.

Silvered glass began to be used for Christmas balls as early as the 1840s in the Lauska region of Germany; the fashion reached the United States by 1846, when the William Demuth Company of New York began to produce silvered balls and beads.

Silvering might also be applied to whimseys.

By the end of the 1870s, high-quality silvered glass was no longer produced in the United States: although silvered glass remained popular until the first decades of the 20th century, the U.S. market had been flooded by European imports.

Many modern reproductions are marketed as "mercury glass" in tableware, ornaments, and other objects. Modern imitation "mercury glass" can be distinguished from antique silvered glass in several ways, including lack of a double wall, and solid bottoms that are different from true antique silvered glass.

== See also ==
- Art glass
- Mirror § History
