= Liquid-mirror telescope =

Telescope whose mirror is a reflective liquid

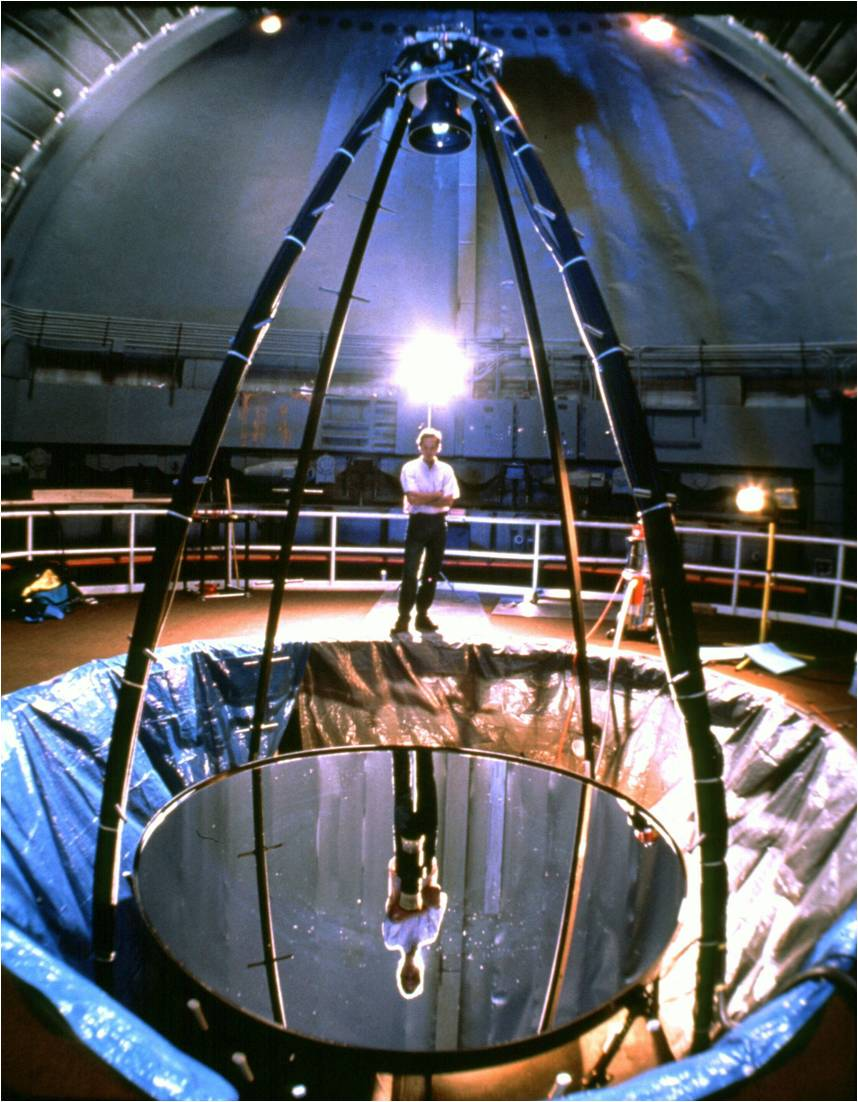
A liquid-mirror telescope. In this design, the optical sensors are mounted above the mirror, in a module at its focus, and the motor and bearings that turn the mirror are in the same module as the sensors. The mirror is suspended below.

Liquid-mirror telescopes are telescopes with mirrors made with a reflective liquid. The most common liquid used is mercury, but other liquids will work as well (for example, low-melting point alloys of gallium). The liquid and its container are rotated at a constant speed around a vertical axis, which causes the surface of the liquid to assume a paraboloidal shape. This parabolic reflector can serve as the primary mirror of a reflecting telescope. The rotating liquid assumes the same surface shape regardless of the container's shape; to reduce the amount of liquid metal needed, and thus weight, a rotating mercury mirror uses a container that is as close to the necessary parabolic shape as feasible. Liquid mirrors can be a low-cost alternative to conventional large telescopes. Compared to a solid glass mirror that must be cast, ground, and polished, a rotating liquid-metal mirror is much less expensive to manufacture.

Isaac Newton noted that the free surface of a rotating liquid forms a circular paraboloid and can therefore be used as a telescope, but he could not build one because he had no way to stabilize the speed of rotation. The concept was further developed by Ernesto Capocci (1798–1864) of the Naples Observatory (1850), but it was not until 1872 that Henry Skey of Dunedin, New Zealand, constructed the first working laboratory liquid-mirror telescope.

Another difficulty is that a liquid-metal mirror can only be used in zenith telescopes, i.e., that look straight up, so it is not suitable for investigations where the telescope must remain pointing at the same location of inertial space (a possible exception to this rule may exist for a liquid-mirror space telescope, where the effect of Earth's gravity is replaced by artificial gravity, perhaps by propelling it gently forward with rockets). Only a telescope located at the North Pole or South Pole would offer a relatively static view of the sky, although the freezing point of mercury and the remoteness of the location would need to be considered. A radio telescope already exists at the South Pole, but the same is not the case with the North Pole as it is located in the Arctic Ocean.

The mercury mirror of the Large Zenith Telescope in Canada was the largest liquid-metal mirror ever built. It had a diameter of 6 metres (20 ft) and rotated at a rate of about 8.5 revolutions per minute. It was decommissioned in 2016. This mirror was a test, built for $1 million, but it was not suitable for astronomy because of the test site's weather. As of 2006, plans were being made to build a larger 8-metre (26 ft) liquid-mirror telescope ALPACA for astronomical use, and a larger project called LAMA with 66 individual 6.15-metre (20.2 ft) telescopes with a total collecting power equal to a 55-meter telescope, resolving power of a 70-metre (230 ft) scope.

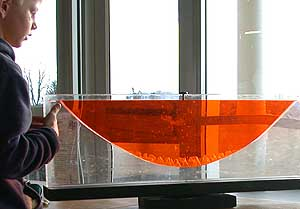
Parabolic shape formed by a liquid surface under rotation. Two liquids of different densities fill a narrow space between two sheets of transparent plastic. The gap between the sheets is closed at the bottom, sides and top. The whole assembly is rotating around a vertical axis passing through the centre.

== Explanation of the equilibrium ==
The force of gravity (red), the buoyancy force (green), and the resultant centripetal force (blue)

In the following discussion, $g$ represents the acceleration due to gravity, $\omega$ represents the angular speed of the liquid's rotation, in radians per second, $m$ is the mass of an infinitesimal parcel of liquid material on the surface of the liquid, $r$ is the distance of the parcel from the axis of rotation, and $h$ is the height of the parcel above a zero to be defined in the calculation.

The force diagram (shown) represents a snapshot of the forces acting on the parcel, in a non-rotating frame of reference. The direction of each arrow shows the direction of a force, and the length of the arrow shows the force's strength. The red arrow represents the weight of the parcel, caused by gravity and directed vertically downward. The green arrow shows the buoyancy force exerted on the parcel by the bulk of the liquid. Since, in equilibrium, the liquid cannot exert a force parallel with its surface, the green arrow must be perpendicular to the surface. The short blue arrow shows the net force on the parcel. It is the vector sum of the forces of weight and buoyancy, and acts horizontally toward the axis of rotation. (It must be horizontal, since the parcel has no vertical acceleration.) It is the centripetal force that constantly accelerates the parcel toward the axis, keeping it in circular motion as the liquid rotates.

The buoyancy force (green arrow) has a vertical component, which must equal the weight $mg$ of the parcel (red arrow), and the horizontal component of the buoyancy force must equal the centripetal force $m \omega^2 r$ (blue arrow). Therefore, the green arrow is tilted from the vertical by an angle whose tangent is the quotient of these forces. Since the green arrow is perpendicular to the surface of the liquid, the slope of the surface must be the same quotient of the forces:

$$\frac{d h}{d r} = \frac{m \omega^2 r}{m g}.$$

Cancelling the $m$ on both sides, integrating, and setting $h = 0$ when $r = 0$ leads to

$$h = \frac{1}{2 g} \omega^2 r^2.$$

This is of the form $h = kr^2$, where $k$ is a constant, showing that the surface is, by definition, a paraboloid.

=== Rotation speed and focal length ===
The equation of the paraboloid in terms of its focal length (see Parabolic reflector#Theory) can be written as

$$4fh = r^2,$$

where $f$ is the focal length, and $h$ and $r$ are defined as above.

Dividing this equation by the last one above it eliminates $h$ and $r$ and leads to

$$2 f \omega^2 = g,$$

which relates the angular velocity of the rotation of the liquid to the focal length of the paraboloid that is produced by the rotation. Note that no other variables are involved. The density of the liquid, for example, has no effect on the focal length of the paraboloid. The units must be consistent, e.g. $f$ may be in metres, $\omega$ in radians per second, and $g$ in metres per second-squared.

If we write $F$ for the numerical value of the focal length in metres, and $S$ for the numerical value of the rotation speed in revolutions per minute (RPM), then on the Earth's surface, where $g$ is approximately 9.81 metres per second-squared, the last equation reduces to the approximation

$$F S^2 \approx 447.$$

If the focal length is in feet instead of metres, this approximation becomes

$$F S^2 \approx 1467.$$

The rotation speed is still in RPM.

== Liquid-mirror telescopes ==
=== Conventional land-based liquid-mirror telescopes ===
These are made of liquid stored in a cylindrical container made of a composite material, such as Kevlar. The cylinder is spun until it reaches a few revolutions per minute. The liquid gradually forms a paraboloid, the shape of a conventional telescopic mirror. The mirror's surface is very precise, and small imperfections in the cylinder's shape do not affect it. The amount of mercury used is small, less than a millimeter in thickness.

=== Moon-based liquid-mirror telescopes ===
Low-temperature ionic liquids (below 130 kelvin) have been proposed as the fluid base for an extremely large-diameter spinning liquid-mirror telescope to be based on the Moon. Low temperature is advantageous in imaging long-wave infrared light, which is the form of light (extremely red-shifted) that arrives from the most distant parts of the visible universe. Such a liquid base would be covered by a thin metallic film that forms the reflective surface.

=== Space-based ring liquid-mirror telescopes ===
The Rice liquid-mirror telescope design is similar to conventional liquid-mirror telescopes. It will only work in space; but in orbit, gravity will not distort the mirror's shape into a paraboloid. The design features a liquid stored in a flat-bottomed ring-shaped container with raised interior edges. The central focal area would be rectangular, but a secondary rectangular-parabolic mirror would gather the light to a focal point. Otherwise the optics are similar to other optical telescopes. The light gathering power of a Rice telescope is equivalent to approximately the width times the diameter of the ring, minus some fraction based on optics, superstructure design, etc.

== Advantages and disadvantages ==
The greatest advantage of a liquid mirror is its small cost, about 1% of a conventional telescope mirror. This cuts down the cost of the entire telescope at least 95%. The University of British Columbia's 6-meter Large Zenith Telescope cost about a fiftieth as much as a conventional telescope with a glass mirror. The greatest disadvantage is that the mirror can only be pointed straight up. Research is underway to develop telescopes that can be tilted, but currently if a liquid mirror were to tilt out of the zenith, it would lose its shape. Therefore, the mirror's view changes as the Earth rotates, and objects cannot be physically tracked. An object can be briefly electronically tracked while in the field of view by shifting electrons across the CCD at the same speed as the image moves; this tactic is called time delay and integration or drift scanning. Some types of astronomical research are unaffected by these limitations, such as long-term sky surveys and supernova searches. Since the universe is believed to be isotropic and homogeneous (this is called the cosmological principle), the investigation of its structure by cosmologists can also use telescopes highly reduced in their direction of view.

Since mercury vapor is toxic to humans and animals, there remains a problem for its use in any telescope where it may affect its users and others in its area. In the Large Zenith Telescope, the mercury mirror and the human operators are housed in separately ventilated rooms. At its location in the Canadian mountains, the ambient temperature is fairly low, which reduces the rate of evaporation of the mercury. The less toxic metal gallium may be used instead of mercury, but it has the disadvantage of high cost. Recently Canadian researchers have proposed the substitution of magnetically deformable liquid mirrors composed of a suspension of iron and silver nanoparticles in ethylene glycol. In addition to low toxicity and relatively low cost, such a mirror would have the advantage of being easily and rapidly deformable using variations of magnetic field strength.

== Gyroscopic effects ==
Usually, the mirror of a liquid-mirror telescope is rotated around two axes simultaneously. For example, the mirror of a telescope on the surface of the Earth rotates at a speed of a few revolutions per minute about a vertical axis to maintain its parabolic shape, and also at a speed of one revolution per day about the Earth's axis because of the rotation of the Earth. Usually (except if the telescope is located at one of the Earth's poles), the two rotations interact so that, in a frame of reference that is stationary relative to the local surface of the Earth, the mirror experiences a torque about an axis that is perpendicular to both rotation axes, i.e. a horizontal axis aligned east–west. Since the mirror is liquid, it responds to this torque by changing its aim direction. The point in the sky at which the mirror is aimed is not exactly overhead, but is displaced slightly to the north or south. The amount of the displacement depends on the latitude, the rotation speeds, and the parameters of the telescope's design. On the Earth, the displacement is small, typically a few arcseconds, which can, nevertheless, be significant in astronomical observations. If the telescope were in space, rotating to produce artificial gravity, the displacement could be much larger, possibly many degrees. This would add complexity to the operation of the telescope.

== List of liquid mirror telescopes ==
Various prototypes exist historically. Following a resurgence of interest in the technology in the 1980s, several projects came to fruition.

- UBC/Laval LMT, 2.65 metres (8.7 ft), 1992
- NASA-LMT, 3 metres (9.8 ft), 1995–2002
- LZT, 6 metres (20 ft), 2003–2016
- ILMT, 4 metres (13 ft), 2011 test, opened in 2022

== See also ==
- List of telescope parts and construction
- List of telescope types
- Mercury glass, internally silvered decorative glass products named for their resemblance to mercury
- Mercury silvering, a technique to apply a thin layer of a precious metal to a base metal object
- Rotating furnace, used to make large glass mirrors
- Liquid-mirror space telescope
- Solar cooker
- Specular reflection
