= List of large optical telescopes =

This is a list of large optical telescopes. For telescopes larger than 3 meters in aperture see List of largest optical reflecting telescopes. This list combines large or expensive reflecting telescopes from any era, as what constitutes famous reflector has changed over time. In 1900 a 1-meter reflector would be among the largest in the world, but by 2000, would be relatively common for professional observatories.

== Large reflectors and catadioptric ==
See List of largest optical reflecting telescopes for continuation of list to larger scopes

| Name | Image | Aperture | Mirror type | Nationality / Sponsors | Site | Built |
|---|---|---|---|---|---|---|
| Harlan J. Smith Telescope | | 2.72 m (107 in) | Single | USA | McDonald Observatory, Texas, USA | 1969 |
| UBC-Laval LMT | | 2.65 m (104 in) | Liquid | Canada | Vancouver, British Columbia, Canada | 1992–2016 |
| Shajn 2.6m "Crimean 102 in." | | 2.64 m (104 in) | Single | | Crimean Astrophysical Obs., Russia/Ukraine | 1961 |
| VLT Survey Telescope (VST) | | 2.61 m (102.8 in) | Single | Italy + ESO countries | Paranal Observatory, Antofagasta Region, Chile | 2007 |
| BAO 2.6 | | 2.6 m (102 in) | Single | | Byurakan Astrophysical Obs., Mt. Aragatz, Armenia | 1976 |
| Nordic Optical Telescope (NOT) | | 2.56 m (101 in) | Single | Denmark, Sweden, Iceland, Norway, Finland | ORM, Canary Islands, Spain | 1988 |
| Javalambre Survey Telescope (JAST/T250) | | 2.55 m (100 in) | Single | International | Javalambre Observatory, Spain (Z32) | TBA |
| Isaac Newton Telescope (INT) | | 2.54 m (100 in) | Single | UK | ORM, Canary Islands, Spain (RGO, England, UK until '79) | 1984 |
| Irenee du Pont Telescope | | 2.54 m (100 in) | Single | USA | Las Campanas Observatory, Coquimbo Region, Chile | 1976 |
| Hooker 100-Inch Telescope | | 2.54 m (100 in) | Single | USA | Mt. Wilson Observatory, California, USA | 1917 |
| Kawkasskaja gornaja observatory GAISCH MGU | | 2.5 m (98.4 in) | Single | Russia | Caucasian mountain observatory, Russia | 2014 |
| SOFIA | | 2.5 m (98.4 in) | Single | USA + Germany | Boeing 747SP (mobile, USA) | 2007 |
| Sloan DSS | | 2.5 m (98.4 in) | Single | USA | Apache Point Observatory, New Mexico, USA | 1997 |
| Hiltner Telescope | | 2.4 m (94.5 in) | Single | USA | MDM Observatory (Kitt Peak), Arizona, USA | 1986 |
| Thai National Telescope (TNT) | | 2.4 m (94.5 in) | Single | Thailand + SEAAN | Thai National Observatory, Doi Inthanon, Thailand | 2013 |
| Lijiang | | 2.4 m (94.5 in) | Single | China | Yunnan Astronomical Observatory, China | 2008 |
| Hubble (HST) | | 2.4 m (94.5 in) | Single | NASA+ESA | Low Earth orbit | 1990 |
| 2.4-meter SINGLE Telescope | | 2.4 m (94.5 in) | Single | USA | Magdalena Ridge Observatory, New Mexico, USA | 2006/2008 |
| Automated Planet Finder | | 2.4 m (94.5 in) | Single | USA | Lick Observatory, California, USA | 2010 |
| Vainu Bappu | | 2.34 m (92.1 in) | Single | India | Vainu Bappu Observatory, Tamil Nadu, India | 1986 |
| Aristarchos | | 2.3 m (90.6 in) | Single | ESO Countries + Greece | Chelmos Observatory, Greece | 2004 |
| WIRO 2.3 | | 2.3 m (90.6 in) | Single IR | USA | Wyoming Infrared Observatory, Wyoming, USA | 1977 |
| ANU 2.3m ATT | | 2.3 m (90.6 in) | Single | | Siding Spring Observatory, New South Wales, Australia | 1984 |
| Bok Telescope (90-inch) | | 2.3 m (90.6 in) | Single | USA | Kitt Peak National Observatory, Arizona, USA | 1969 |
| University of Hawaii 2.2 m (UH88) | | 2.24 m (88.2 in) | Single | USA | Mauna Kea Observatories, Hawaii, USA | 1970 |
| MPIA-ESO (ESO-MPI) | | 2.2 m (86.6 in) | Single | West Germany | La Silla Observatory, Coquimbo Region, Chile | 1984 |
| MPIA-CAHA 2.2m | | 2.2 m (86.6 in) | Single | West Germany | Calar Alto Observatory, Almería, Spain | 1979 |
| Xinglong 2.16m | | 2.16 m (85.0 in) | Single | PRC (China) | Xinglong, China | 1989 |
| Jorge Sahade 2.15m | | 2.15 m (84.6 in) | Single | | Leoncito Astronomical Complex, San Juan Province, Argentina | 1987 |
| INAOE 2.12 (OAGH) | | 2.12 m (83.5 in) | Single | Mexico + USA | Guillermo Haro Observatory, Sonora, Mexico | 1987 |
| UNAM 2.12 | | 2.12 m (83.5 in) | Single | | National Astronomical Observatory, Baja California, Mexico | 1979 |
| Fraunhofer-Teleskop | | 2.1 m (83 in) | | Ger | Observatorium Wendelstein, Deutschland | 2012 |
| Kitt Peak 2.1-meter | | 2.1 m (82.7 in) | Single | USA | Kitt Peak National Observatory, Arizona, USA | 1964 |
| Otto Struve Telescope | | 2.08 m (81.9 in) | Single | USA | McDonald Observatory, Texas, USA | 1939 |
| T13 Automated Spectroscopic Telescope | | 2.06 m (81.1 in) | Single | USA (NASA, NSF, & TSU) | Fairborn Observatory, Arizona, USA | 2003 |
| Himalayan Chandra Telescope (HCT) | | 2.01 m (79.1 in) | Single | | Indian Astronomical Observatory, India | 2000 |
| Alfred-Jensch-Teleskop | | 2 m (78.7 in) | Single | East Germany | Karl Schwarzschild Observatory, Germany | 1960 |
| Carl Zeiss Jena | | 2 m (78.7 in) | Single | | Shamakhi Astrophysical Obs., Azerbaijan | 1966 |
| Ondřejov 2-m | | 2 m (78.7 in) | Single | Czechoslovakia | Ondřejov Observatory, Czech | 1967 |
| Ritchey-Chretien-Coude (RCC) | | 2 m (78.7 in) | Single | Bulgaria | Rozhen Observatory, Bulgaria | 1984 |
| Carl Zeiss Jena | | 2 m (78.7 in) | Single | Ukraine, Russia | Peak Terskol Observatory, Russia | 1995 |
| Bernard Lyot Telescope | | 2 m (78.7 in) | Single | France | Pic du Midi Obs., France | 1980 |
| Liverpool Telescope | | 2 m (78.7 in) | Single | UK | ORM, Canary Islands, Spain | 2003 |
| Faulkes Telescope North | | 2 m (78.7 in) | Single | UK | Haleakala Observatory, Hawaii, USA | 2003 |
| Faulkes Telescope South | | 2 m (78.7 in) | Single | UK | Siding Spring Observatory, New South Wales, Australia | 2001 |
| NAYUTA | | 2 m (78.7 in) | Single | Japan | Nishi-Harima Observatory, Hyogo, Japan | 2004 |
| MAGNUM | | 2 m (78.7 in) | Single IR | Japan | Haleakala Observatory, Hawaii, USA | 2001–2008 |

== Selected telescopes below about 2 meters aperture ==
A non-comprehensive non-exclusionary list of telescopes one yard to less than 2 metres in aperture.

| Name | Aperture m | Aper. in | Mirror type | Nationality of Sponsors | Site | Built |
|---|---|---|---|---|---|---|
| OHP 1.93 | 1.93 m | 76″ | Single | France | Haute-Provence Observatory, France | 1958 |
| 74 inch (1.9 m) Radcliffe Telescope | 1.88 m | 74″ | Single | | South African Astronomical Observatory; Sutherland (1974–present); Radcliffe Observatory, Pretoria, South Africa (1948– 1974) | 1950 |
| 1.88 m telescope | 1.88 m | 74″ | Single | Japan | Okayama Astrophysical Observatory, Japan | 1960 |
| DDO 1.88 m | 1.88 m | 74″ | Single | Canada | David Dunlap Observatory, Ontario, Canada | 1935 |
| 74" reflector | 1.88 m | 74″ | Single | Australia | Mount Stromlo Observatory, Australian Capital Territory, Australia | 1955–2003 |
| Kottamia telescope 1.88 m | 1.88 m | 74″ | Single | Egypt | Egypt | 1960 |
| Sandy Cross Telescope | 1.85 m | 73” | Single | Canada | Rothney Astrophysical Observatory, Alberta, Canada | 1986 |
| SETI Optical Telescope | 1.83 m | 72″ | Single | USA | Oak Ridge Observatory, Massachusetts, USA | 2006 |
| Vatican Advanced Technology Telescope (VATT) | 1.83 m | 72″ | Single | Vatican City | Mount Graham International Observatory, Arizona, USA | 1993 |
| 72-Inch Perkins Telescope | 1.83 m | 72″ | Single | USA | Lowell Observatory, Arizona, USA | 1964 |
| Plaskett telescope | 1.83 m | 72″ | Single | Canada | Dominion Astrophysical Observatory, British Columbia, Canada | 1918 |
| Leviathan of Parsonstown | 1.83 m | 72″ | Metal | Great Britain | Birr Castle; Ireland; Historical recreation | 1845 |
| Copernico 1.82 m | 1.82 m | 72″ | Single | Italy | Asiago Observatory, Italy | 1973 |
| 1.8 meter telescope | 1.80 m | 71″ | Single | China | Gaomeigu site of Yunnan Astronomical Observatory, China | 2009 |
| Pan-STARRS PS1 | 1.8 m | 71″ | Single | Germany, Taiwan, US, UK | Haleakala Observatory, Hawaii, USA | 2007 |
| VLT Auxiliary Telescopes (1.8 x 4) | 1.80 m | 71″ | Single | Europe | Paranal Observatory, Antofagasta Region, Chile | 2006 |
| Spacewatch 1.8-meter Telescope | 1.80 m | 71″ | Single | USA | Kitt Peak National Observatory, Arizona, USA | 2001 |
| 1.8m Ritchey Cretien reflector | 1.80 m | 72″ | Single | Korea | Bohyunsan Optical Astronomy Observatory, Korea | 1996 |
| Largest amateur telescope in 2013 | 1.778 m | 70″ | Single | USA | Utah, USA (mobile) | 2013 |
| 69-inch Perkins Telescope | 1.75 m | 69″ | Single | USA | Perkins Observatory, Ohio, USA | 1931–1964 |
| 1.65 m telescope | 1.65 m | 65″ | Single | | Molėtai Astronomical Obs., Lithuania | 1991 |
| McMath–Pierce solar telescope | 1.61 m | 63″ | Single | USA | Kitt Peak National Observatory, Arizona, USA | 1962 |
| BBO NST | 1.60 m | 63″ | Solar | USA | Big Bear Solar Observatory, California, USA | 2009 |
| AZT-33 | 1.60 m | 63″ | Single | | Sayan Solar Observatory, Siberia, Russia | 1981 |
| 1.6 m Perkin Elmer | 1.60 m | 63″ | Single | Brazil | Pico dos Dias Observatory, Minas Gerais, Brazil | 1981 |
| Observatoire du Mont-Mégantic | 1.60 m | 63″ | Single IR | Canada | Mont Mégantic Observatory, Québec, Canada | 1978 |
| 1.56m optical telescope | 1.56 m | 62″ | Single | China | Shanghai Astronomical Observatory, China | 1988 |
| Kaj Strand Telescope | 1.55 m | 61″ | Single | USA | USNO Flagstaff Station, Arizona, USA | 1964 |
| 61" Kuiper Telescope | 1.55 m | 61″ | Single | USA | Steward Observatory, Arizona, USA | 1965 |
| Oak Ridge Observatory 61" reflector | 1.55 m | 61″ | Single | USA | Oak Ridge Observatory, Massachusetts, USA | 1933 |
| Estación Astrofísica de Bosque Alegre | 1.54 m | 60.6″ | Single | Argentina | Estación Astrofísica de Bosque Alegre, Argentina | 1942 |
| Toppo Telescope No.1 (TT1) | 1.537 m | 60.5″ | Single (R/C) | Italy | Astronomical Observatory of Castelgrande, Italy | 2008 |
| Harvard 60-inch Reflector | 1.524 m | 60″ | Single | USA | Harvard College Observatory, Massachusetts, USA | 1905–1931 |
| Hale 60-Inch Telescope | 1.524 m | 60″ | Single | USA | Mt. Wilson Observatory, California, USA | 1908 |
| Dunn Solar Telescope ex-VTT | 1.524 m | 60″ | Single | USA | National Solar Observatory, New Mexico, USA | 1969 |
| FLWO 1.5m Tillinghast | 1.52 m | 60″ | Single | USA | F. L. Whipple Observatory, Arizona | 1994 |
| Telescopio Carlos Sánchez (TCS) | 1.52 m | 60″ | Single | UK + Spain | Teide Observatory, Canary Islands, Spain | 1971 |
| OHP 1.52 | 1.52 m | 60″ | Single | France | Haute-Provence Obs., France | 1967 |
| Mt. Lemmon 60" Dahl-Kirkham Telescope | 1.52 m | 60″ | Single IR | USA | Steward Obs. (Mt. Lemmon), Arizona, USA | 1970 |
| Steward Observatory 60" Cassegrain Telescope | 1.52 m | 60″ | Single | USA | Steward Obs. (Mt. Lemmon), Arizona, USA | 1960s |
| OAN 1.52 m | 1.52 m | 60″ | Single | Spain | Calar Alto Observatory, Almería, Spain | 1970s |
| 1.52 m G.D. Cassini | 1.52 m | 60″ | Single | Italy | Mount Orzale, Loiano, Italy | 1976 |
| Leopold Figl Observatory | 1.50 m | 59″ | Single | Austria | Mitterschöpfl, Vienna Woods Biosphere Reserve, Austria | 1970 |
| TIRGO Gornergrat Infrared Telescope | 1.50 m | 59″ | Single IR | Italy + Switzerland | Hochalpine Forschungsstation Jungfraujoch und Gornergrat, Alps, Switzerland | 1979–2005 |
| AZT-22 | 1.50 m | 59″ | Single | | Mount Maidanak, Uzbekistan | 1972 |
| RTT150 (ex-AZT-22) | 1.50 m | 59″ | Single | Russia + Turkey | TÜBİTAK National Obs., Turkey | |
| AZT-20 | 1.50 m | 59″ | Single | | Assy-Turgen Observatory, Kazakhstan | |
| AZT-12 | 1.50 m | 59″ | Single | Estonia | Tartu Observatory, Estonia | 1976 |
| Hexapod-Telescope (HPT) | 1.50 m | 59″ | Single | Germany | Cerro Armazones Observatory, Antofagasta Region, Chile | 2005 |
| OSN 1.5m (Nasmyth) | 1.50 m | 59″ | Single | Spain | Sierra Nevada Observatory, Granada, Spain | |
| Persona-1 (C.2441) | 1.50 m | 59″ | Korsch | Russia | Earth Orbit (SSO, terrestrial viewing) | 2008 |
| GREGOR solar/night telescope | 1.50 m | 59″ | Single | Germany | Teide Observatory, Tenerife, Spain | 2012 |
| IRSF 1.4m | 1.40 m | | Single | | Sutherland, South Africa Astronomical Observatory | 2000 |
| TCC (Telescope Constantinos Caratheodory) | 1.40 m | | Single | Greece | EUDOXOS Observatories Complex, Mount Ainos, Kefalonia. 38°10'12"N 20°36'36"E | 2010 |
| ESO Coudé Auxiliary Telescope (CAT) | 1.40 m | | Single | | La Silla, Chile | 1981 |
| Ruths Telescope | 1.37 m | 53.9″ | Metal | Italy | Merate Obs., Merate, Italy | 1968 |
| SkyMapper | 1.35 m | 53.15″ | Single | Australia | Siding Spring Observatory, New South Wales, Australia | 2008 |
| USNOFS 1.3m | 1.30 m | 51″ | Single | USA | USNO Flagstaff Station, Arizona, USA | 1998 |
| Skalnaté pleso Observatory | 1.30 m | | Single | Slovakia | Skalnaté pleso Observatory, Astronomical Institute of Slovak Academy of Sciences, Slovakia | 2014 |
| Skinakas Obs. 1.3m | 1.30 m | | Single | Greece | Skinakas Observatory, Island of Crete, Greece | 1995 |
| McGraw-Hill Telescope | 1.27 m | 50″ | Single | USA | MDM Observatory, Arizona, USA (1975–present); Dexter, Michigan, USA (1969–1975) | 1969 |
| 1.26m infrared telescope | 1.26 m | 49.5" | Single | China | Xinglong Station, China | 1991 |
| Herschel 40-foot(1.26 m d.) | 1.26 m | 49.5″ | Metal | Great Britain + Ireland | Observatory House; England | 1789–1815 |
| AZT-11 | 1.25 m | 49″ | Single | | Abastumani Observatory, Rep. of Georgia | 1976 |
| AZT-11 | 1.25 m | 49″ | Single | | Crimean Astrophysical Obs., Russia/Ukraine | 1981 |
| MPIA 1.2 | 1.23 m | 48.4″ | Single | West Germany+Spain | Calar Alto Obs., Alemíra, Spain | 1975 |
| T-122 | 1.22 m | 48″ | Schmidt | Turkey | ÇOMÜ Ulupınar Observatory, Çanakkale, Turkey | 2002 |
| Galileo 1.22 m | 1.22 m | 48″ | Single | Italy | Asiago Observatory, Italy | 1942 |
| Samuel Oschin telescope | 1.22 m | 48″ | Schmidt | USA | Palomar Observatory, California, USA | 1948 |
| Great Melbourne Telescope | 1.22 m | 48″ | Metal | Great Britain | Melbourne Observatory, Victoria, Australia | 1878–1889 |
| William Lassell 48-inch | 1.22 m | 48″ | Metal | Great Britain | Malta | 1861–1865 |
| Barabarella (OMI 48 inch) | 1.22 m | 48″ | Single | USA | Lowrey Observatory, Texas, USA | 2008 |
| Babelsberg Zeiss | 1.20 m | 47″ | Single | Germany | Babelsberg Observatory, Berlin, Germany | 1924–1947 |
| Oskar-Lühning Telescope | 1.20 m | 47″ | Single | Germany | Hamburg Observatory, Germany | 1975 |
| Leonhard Euler Telescope | 1.20 m | 47″ | Single | Switzerland | La Silla Observatory, Coquimbo Region, Chile | 1998 |
| Mercator Telescope | 1.20 m | 47″ | Single | Belgium+Switzerland | ORM, Canary Islands, Spain | 2001 |
| Hamburg Robotic Telescope (HRT) | 1.20 m | 47″ | Single | Germany | Hamburg-Bergdorf Obs., Germany | 2002 |
| UK Schmidt Telescope | 1.20 m | 47″ | Schmidt | UK | Siding Spring Observatory, New South Wales, Australia | 1973 |
| GeoEye-1 | 1.10 m | 43.3″ | Single | USA | Earth Orbit (terrestrial viewing) | 2008 |
| Hänssgen's reflector | 1.07 m | 42″ | Single | Germany | Mobile (~Germany) | 2002 |
| KLENOT | 1.06 m | 42″ | Single | Czech Republic | Kleť Observatory, Czech Republic | 2002 |
| Nickel Telescope | 1.02 m | 40″ | Single | USA | Lick Observatory, California, USA | 1979 |
| UTAS 40-inch | 1.02 m | 40" | R/C | Australia | Mount Canopus, Tasmania, Australia | 1973 |
| George Ritchey 40-inch (1 m) | 1.02 m | 40″ | R/C | USA | USNO Flagstaff Station, Arizona, USA (Washington, D.C. until 1955) | 1934 |
| Yerkes "41-inch" | 1.02 m | 40″ | Single | USA | Yerkes Observatory, Wisconsin, USA | 1968 |
| Zeiss di Merate (1m reflector) | 1.02 m | 40″ | Single | Kingdom of Italy | Merate Obs., Merate, Italy | 1926 |
| ZIMLAT | 1.00 m | 39.4″ | Single | Switzerland | Zimmerwald Obs., Switzerland | 1997 |
| Meudon Observatory 1m | 1.00 m | 39.4″ | Single | France | Meudon Observatory/ Paris Observatory | 1891 |
| Lulin One-meter Telescope (LOT) | 1.00 m | 39.4" | Single | Taiwan | Lulin Observatory, Taiwan | 2002 |
| Vihorlat national telescope | 1.00 m | 39.4" | single | Slovakia | Astronomical observatory on Kolonický mountain pass, Slovakia | |
| Wise one-meter telescope | 1.00 m | 39.4" | single | Israel | Wise Observatory, Israel | 1973 |
| SAAO 1-meter Elizabeth Telescope | 1.00m | 39.4″ | Single | South Africa | South African Astronomical Observatory; Cape Town, South Africa (1962-c.1975); Sutherland, South Africa (c.1975–present) | 1962 |
| Near-Earth Object Survey Telescope (NEOST) | 1.00 m | 39.4" | Single | China | Purple Mountain Observatory, China | 2006 |
| RT 1.00 m | 1.00 m | 39.4″ | | | TÜBİTAK National Observatory | |
| OGS Telescope | 1.00 m | 39.4″ | Single | European Space Agency countries | Teide Observatory, Canary Islands, Spain | 1995 |
| Jacobus Kapteyn Telescope | 1.00 m | 39.4″ | Single | UK + Netherlands | Isaac Newton Group, Canary Islands, Spain | 1984 |
| T1M | 1.00 m | 39.4″ | Cassegrain | France | Lyon Observatory, Saint-Genis-Laval, France | 1970s |
| Hamburg Spiegelteleskop (1m reflector) | 1.00 m | 39.4″ | Single | Deutsches Reich (Germany) | Hamburg-Bergdorf Obs., Germany | 1911 |
| Kepler Mission telescope | 0.95 m | 37.4″ | Single | USA | Earth-trailing Orbit (Heliocentric) | 2009 |
| James Gregory Telescope | 0.94 m | 37" | Single | Great Britain | University of St Andrews, Scotland, UK | 1962 |
| Kuiper Airborne Obs.(KAO) | 0.914 m | 36″ | Single | USA | C-141 (mobile) | 1974–1995 |
| Crossley Reflector | 0.914 m | 36″ | Single | US+UK | Lick Observatory, California, USA | 1896 |
| A.A. Common Reflector | 0.914 m | 36″ | Single | Great Britain | Great Britain | 1880–1896 |
| Rosse 36-inch Telescope | 0.914 m | 36″ | Metal | Great Britain | Birr Castle; Ireland | 1826 |
| SMARTS 0.9m Telescope | 0.914 m | 36″ | Single | USA, SMARTS | Cerro Tololo Inter-American Observatory, Coquimbo Region, Chile | 1965 |
| Spacewatch 0.9m Telescope | 0.914 m | 36″ | Single | USA | Steward Observatory enclave at Kitt Peak National Observatory, Arizona, USA | Contracted 1915, Completed 1921 |
| Yapp telescope | 0.914 m | 36″ | Single | U.K. | Royal Observatory, Greenwich +Herstmonceux | 1934-1990 |

== Selected telescopes below about 1 meter/yard aperture ==
| Name | Aperture m | Aper. in | Type | Nationality of Sponsors | Site | Built/Used |
|---|---|---|---|---|---|---|
| Schmidt 67/92 | 0.92 m | 36.2″ | Schmidt | Italy | Asiago Observatory, Italy | 1967 |
| Hopkins Ultraviolet Telescope | 0.90 m | 35.4″ | Single UV | USA | Earth Orbit | 1990, 1995 |
| Potsdam Great Refractor (double refractor) | 0.80 m | 31.5 ″ | Doublet | Germany | Potsdam, Germany | 1899 |
| Optical Ground Station Oberpfaffenhofen | 0.80 m | 31.5 ″ | R/C | Germany | Oberpfaffenhofen, Germany | 2022 |
| Pine Mountain Observatory 32" | 0.82 m | 32" | Single | USA | Pine Mountain Observatory, Pine Mountain, Oregon. 6300 feet elevation. | 1970 |
| IAC80 | 0.82 m | 32" | Single | Spain | Teide Observatory, Canary Islands, Spain | 1993 |
| JAST/T80 | 0.80 m | Single | | Javalambre Observatory, Spain (Z32) | | |
| Joan Oró telescope | 0.80 m | 32" | R/C | Spain | Montsec Astronomical Observatory, Catalonia. 5150 feet elevation. | 2008 |
| UMBC Observatory | 0.80 m | 32" | R/C | United States | University of Maryland, Baltimore County, Baltimore, MD. 200 feet elevation | 1999 |
| Astron | 0.80 m | 31.5″ | Single UV | CCCP + France | Earth orbit | 1983–1989 |
| Ruisinger | 0.762 m | 30″ | Single-Newtonian | USA – ASKC | Powell Observatory; Louisburg, Kansas | 1985 |
| Obsession Telescopes #102 | 0.762 m | 30″ | Single | USA | Omaha, Nebraska (mobile) | 1993 |
| AKARI (ASTRO-F) | 0.685 m | 27″ | Single IR | Japan + Misc. | Earth Orbit | 2006–2011 |
| William Lassell 24-inch | 0.61 m | 24″ | Metal | Great Britain | Liverpool, England | 1845 |
| Infrared Space Observatory | 0.60 m | 23.5″ | Single IR (2.4 to 240) | European Space Agency | Earth orbit (GEO) | 1995–1998 |
| TRAPPIST | 0.60 m | 23.5″ | Single | Belgium | La Silla Observatory, Coquimbo Region, Chile | 2010 |
| IRAS | 0.57 m | 22.44″ | Single IR | USA + UK + The Netherlands | Earth orbit | 1983 |
| Antarctica Schmidt telescopes (AST3-1) | 0.50 m | 19.7″ | Single | China | Antarctic Kunlun Station | 2012 |
| Mars Reconnaissance Orbiter—HiRISE | 0.50 m | 19.7″ | R/C | USA | Mars orbit | 2005 |
| TacSat-2 | 0.50 m | 19.7″ | R/C | USA | Earth orbit (terrestrial viewing) | 2006–2011 |
| Uppsala Southern Schmidt Telescope | 0.50 m | 19.7″ | Schmidt | Multiple | Sweden / Australia | 1956–2013 |
| Ege University- A48 Reflecting Cassegrain telescope | 0.48 m | 18.9″ | Single | Turkey | Ege University Observatory, Izmir, Turkey | 1968 |
| Herschel 20-foot (0.475 m d.) | 0.475 m | 18.5″ | Metal | Great Britain | Observatory House; England | 1782 |
| Dutch Open Telescope (DOT) | 0.45 m | 17.7″ | Solar | Denmark | ORM, Canary Islands | 1997 |
| Explorer 57 (IUE) | 0.45 m | 17.7″ | UV | US+UK+ESA Countries | Earth orbit (GEO) | 1978–1996 |
| University of Rochester Telescope Project | 0.40 m | 16″ | R/C | USA | Rochester NY (mobile) | 2011 |
| Tianwen-1 (HiRIC) | 0.387 m | 15″ | | China | Mars orbit | 2021 |
| Armagh 15- inch Grubb Reflector | 0.38 m | 15″ | Metal | Great Britain | Armagh Observatory, Northern Ireland | 1835 |
| TacSat-3 | 0.35 m | 14″ | R/C | USA | Earth orbit (terrestrial viewing) | 2009–2012 |
| Mars Global Surveyor—MOC | 0.35 m | 13.8″ | R/C | USA | Mars Orbit | 1996–2006 |
| JHS Meade | 0.31 m | 12″ | S/C | Germany | NEO (Near Earth Objects) | 2009 |
| XMM-Newton—UV camera | 0.30 m | 11.9″ | Single UV | ESA Countries | Earth orbit | 1998 |
| SWIFT UVOT | 0.30 m | 11.9″ | Single UV | US+ UK+Italy | Earth orbit | 2004 |
| Hipparcos | 0.29 m | 11.4″ | Schmidt | European Space Agency | Earth orbit (GTO) | 1989–1993 |
| CoRoT | 0.27 m | 10.6″ | afocal | France + ESA | Earth orbit | 2007 |
| Centre for Basic Space Science Optical Telescopes | 0.25 m | 9.84″ | Single | Nigeria | NASRDA-CBSS Observatory, Nsukka | 2006 |
| Astronomical Netherlands Satellite | 0.22 m | 8.7″ | Single UV | The Netherlands & USA | Earth Orbit | 1974–1976 |
| New Horizons—LORRI | 0.208 m | 8.2″ | R/C | USA | Space (33+ AU from Earth) | 2006 |
| Lunar Reconnaissance Orbiter LROC-NAC | 0.195 m | 7.68″ | Reflector | USA | Lunar orbit | 2009 |
| Hadley's Reflector | 0.15 m | 6″ | Metal | Great Britain | England (mobile) | 1721 |
| Chinese Small Telescope Array (CSTAR) | 0.145 m | 6″ | Single | China | Antarctic Kunlun Station | 2008 |
| University of Tokyo PRISM | 0.10 m | 3.9″ | Single | Japan | Earth Orbit (terrestrial viewing) | 2009 |
| Newton's reflector | 0.033 m | 1.3″ | Metal | Great Britain | England (mobile) | 1669 |
| MESSENGER MDIS-WAC | 0.03 m | 1.18″ | Lens | USA | Space (Mercury orbit) | 2004 |
| MESSENGER MDIS-NAC | 0.025 m | 0.98″ | R/C | USA | Space (Mercury orbit) | 2004 |
| Dawn Framing Camera (FC1/FC2) | 0.02 m | 0.8″ | Lens | Germany + USA | Space (Asteroid belt) | 2007 |

== See also ==
- Lists of telescopes
