= List of largest optical reflecting telescopes =

Telescopes with aperture diameter >8 metres

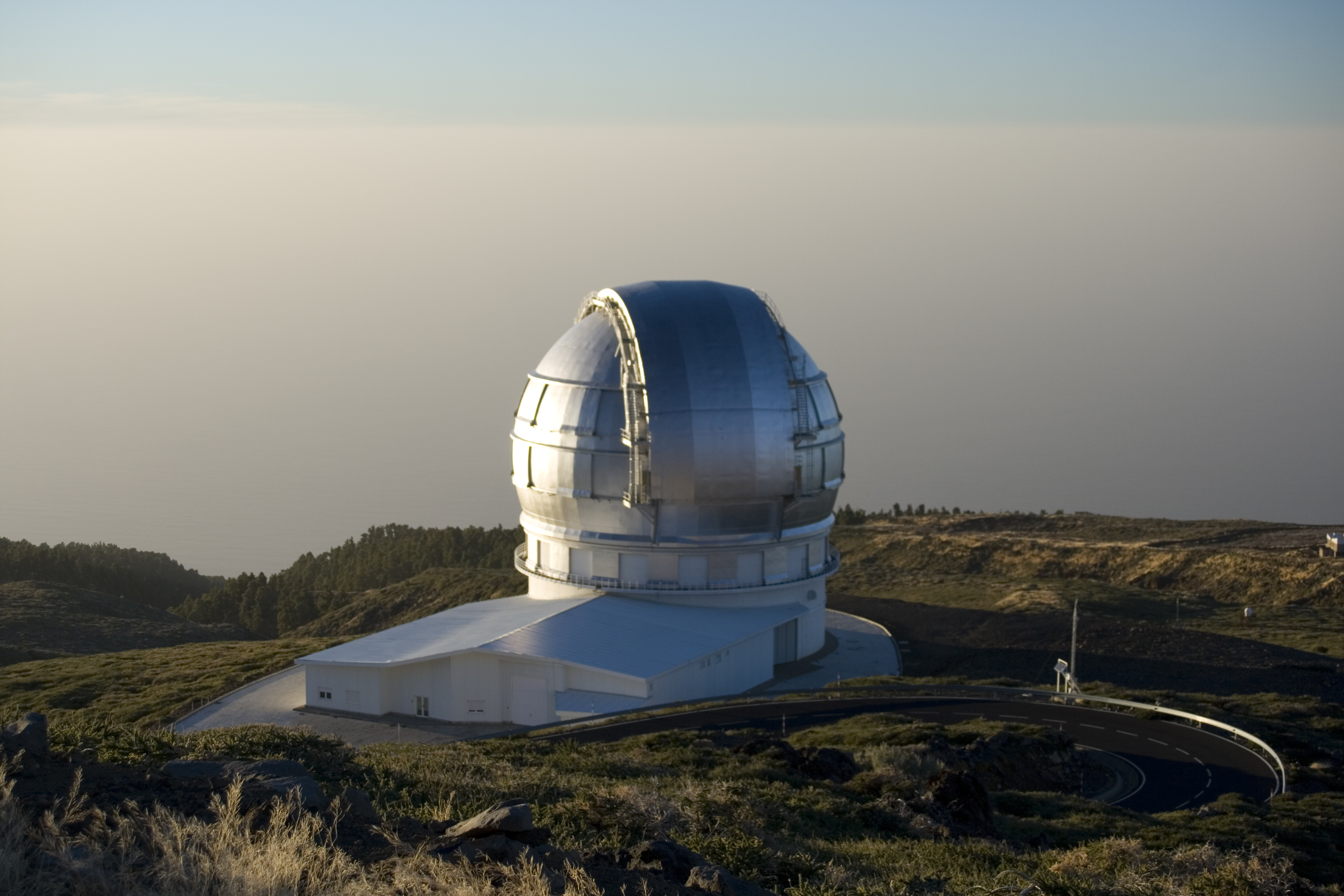
Gran Telescopio Canarias

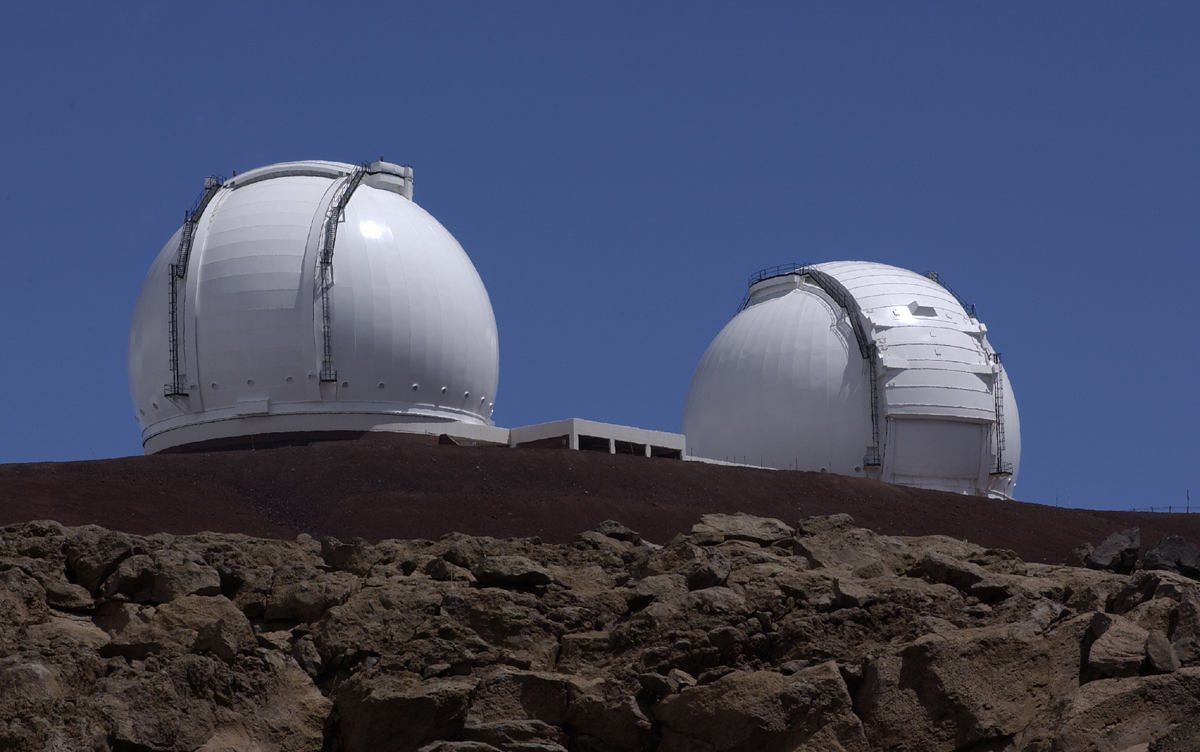
W. M. Keck Observatory

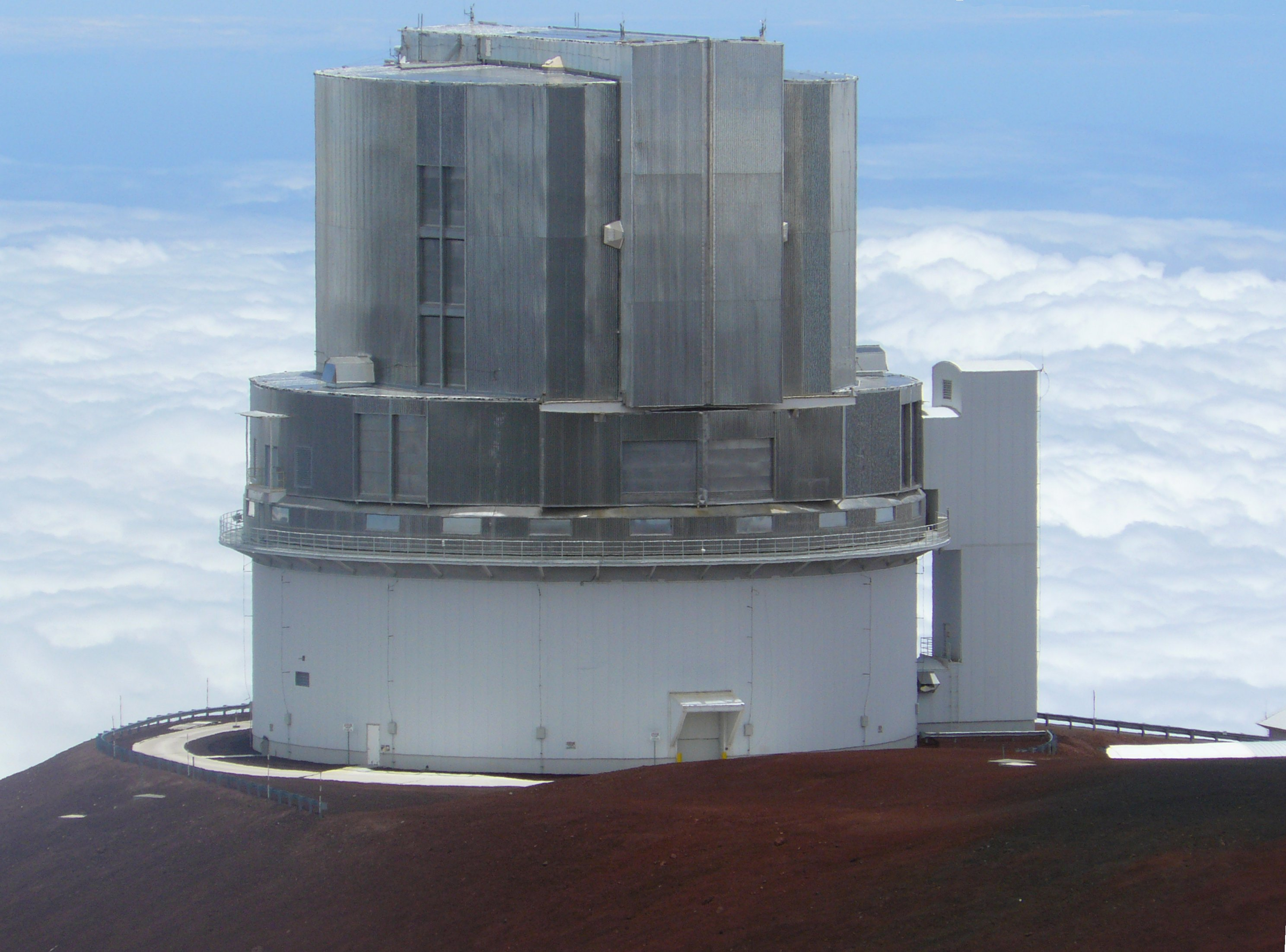
Subaru Telescope

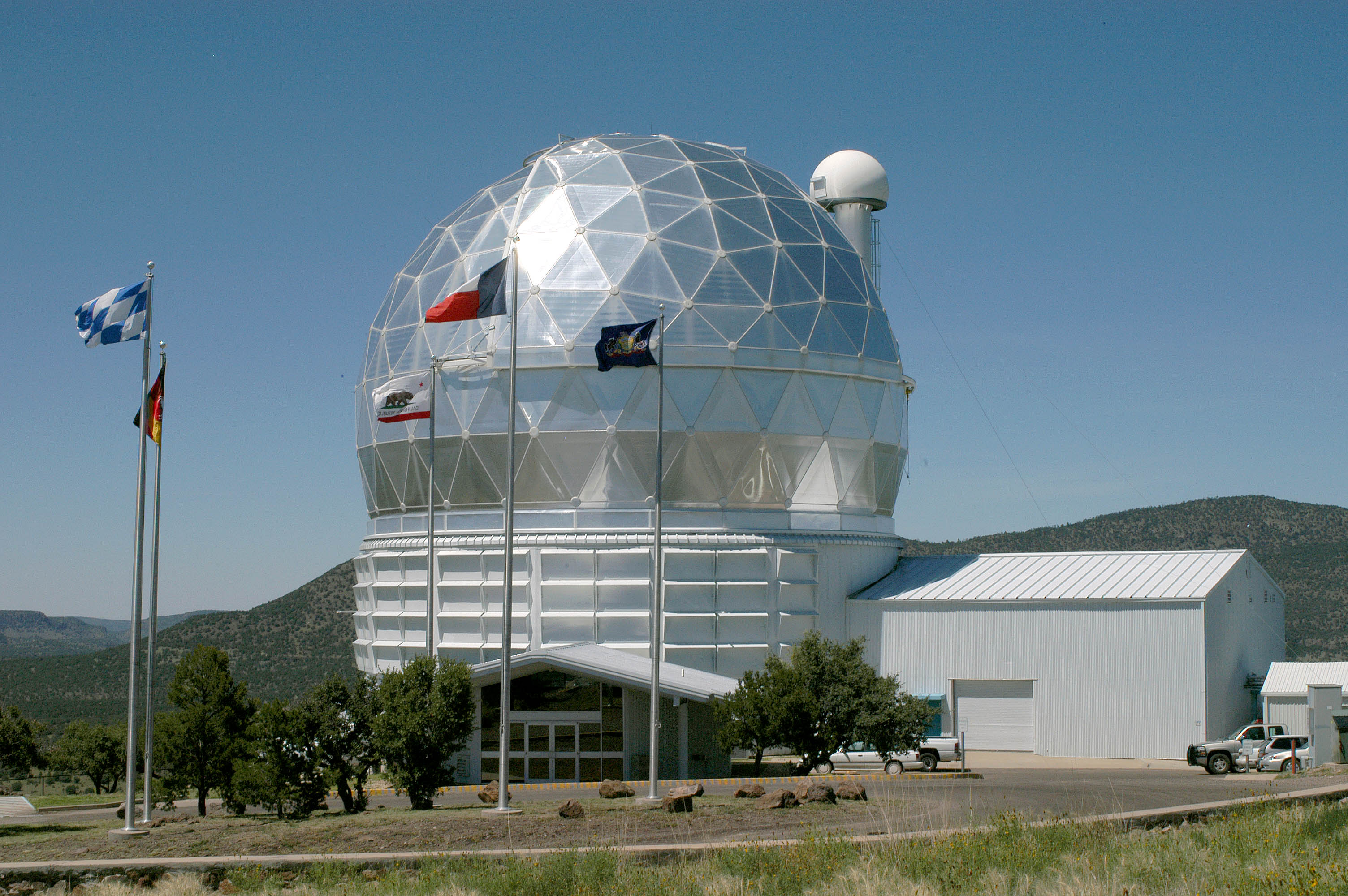
Hobby–Eberly Telescope

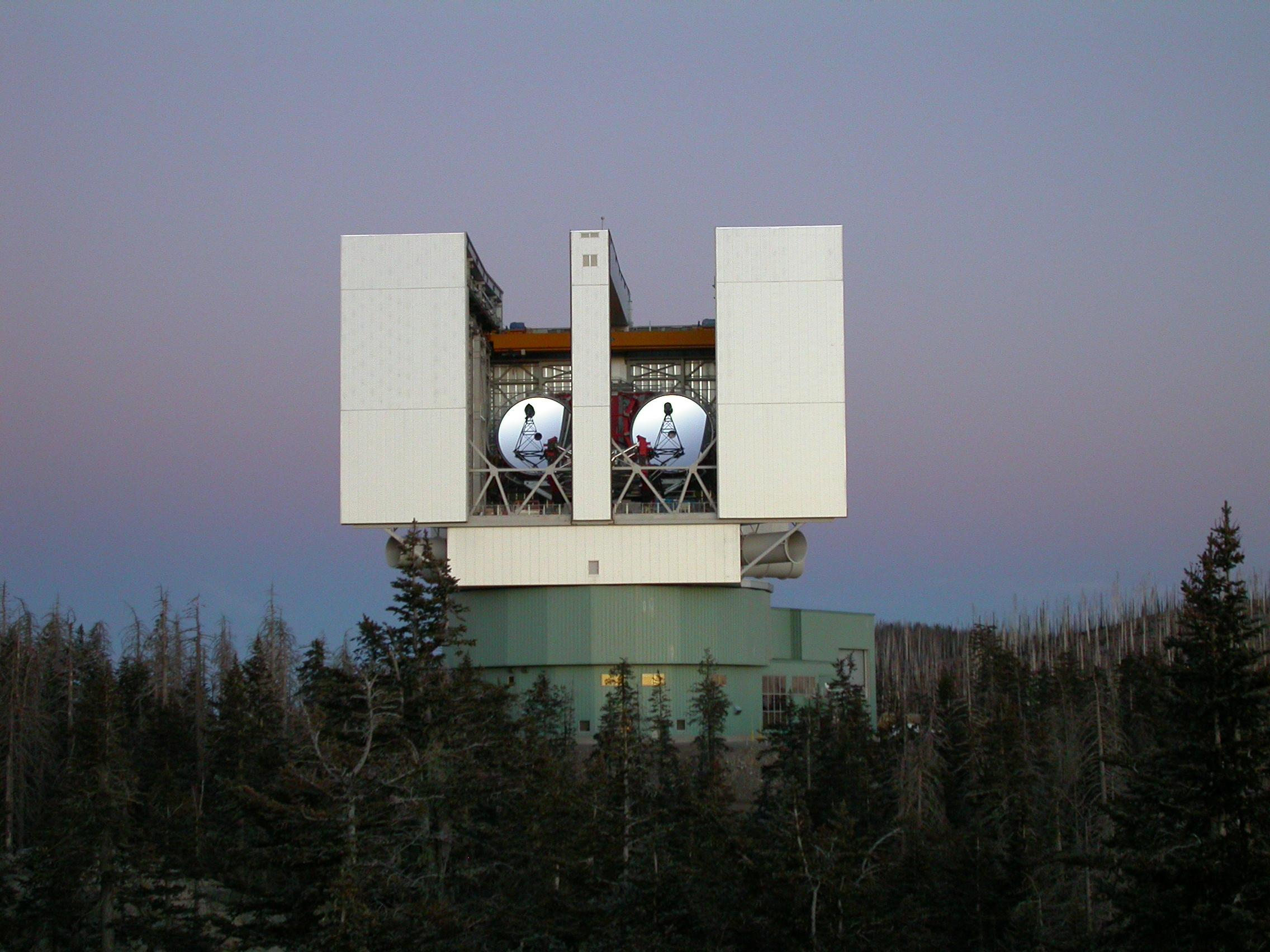
Large Binocular Telescope

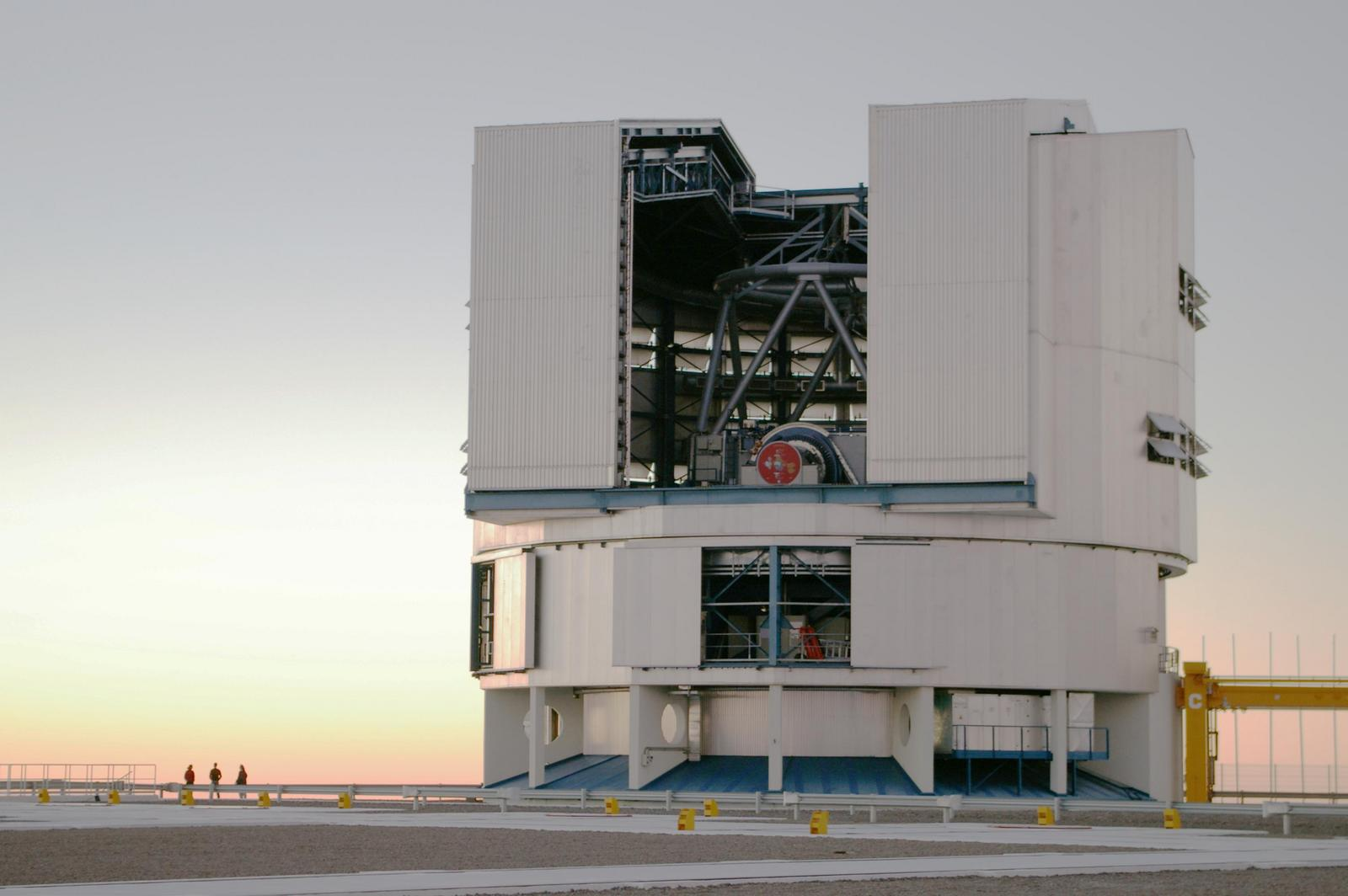
Very Large Telescope

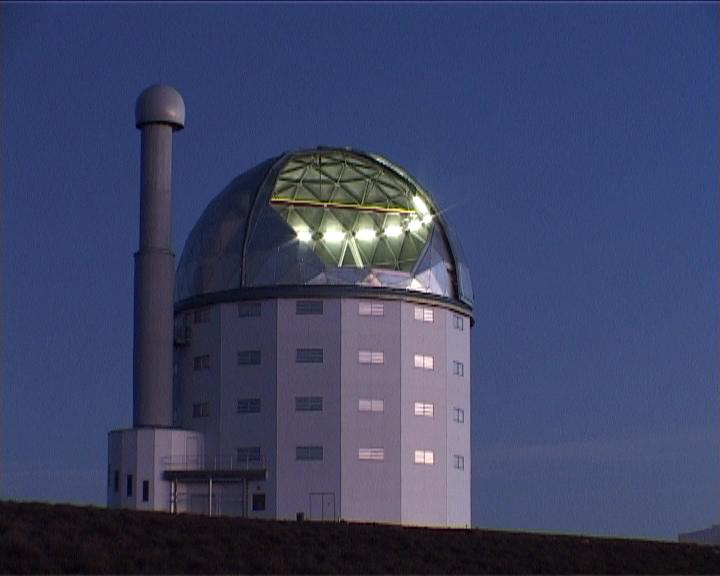
Southern African Large Telescope

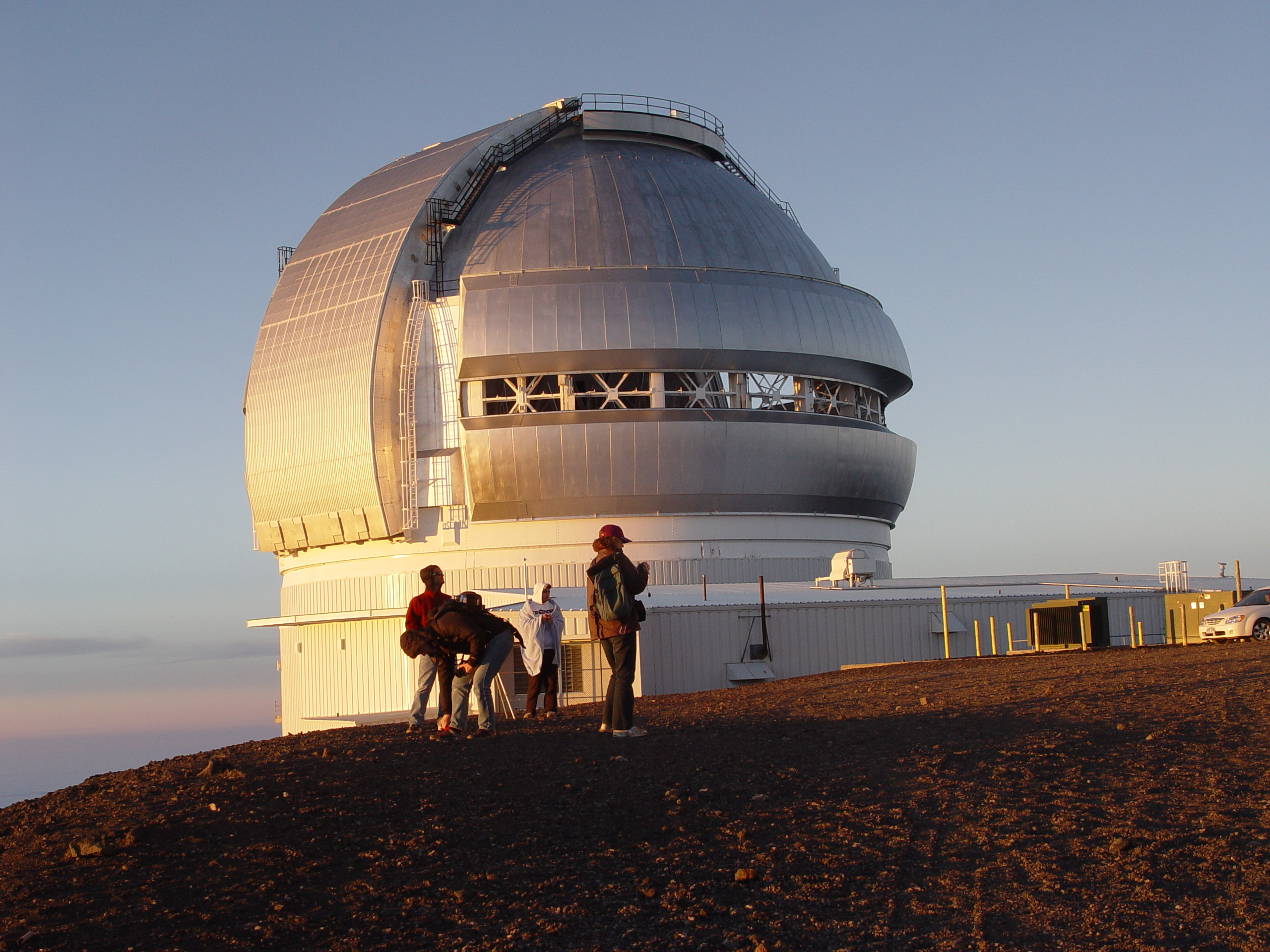
Gemini North

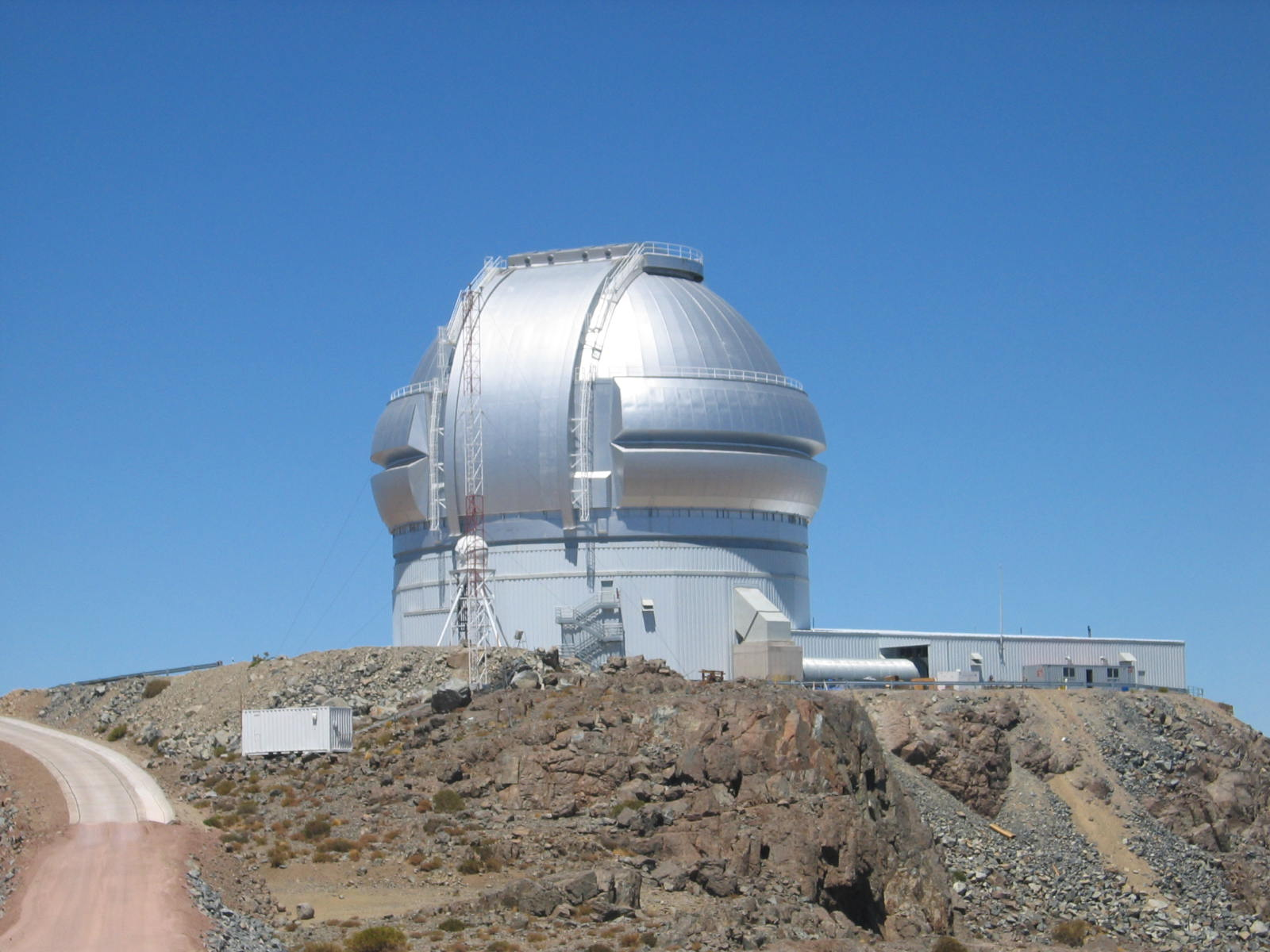
Gemini South

This list of the largest optical reflecting telescopes with objective diameters of 3.0 metres (120 in) or greater is sorted by aperture, which is a measure of the light-gathering power and resolution of a reflecting telescope. The mirrors themselves can be larger than the aperture, and some telescopes may use aperture synthesis through interferometry. Telescopes designed to be used as optical astronomical interferometers such as the Keck I and II used together as the Keck Interferometer (up to 85 m) can reach higher resolutions, although at a narrower range of observations. When the two mirrors are on one mount, the combined mirror spacing of the Large Binocular Telescope (22.8 m) allows fuller use of the aperture synthesis.

Largest does not always equate to being the best telescopes, and overall light gathering power of the optical system can be a poor measure of a telescope's performance. Space-based telescopes, such as the Hubble Space Telescope, take advantage of being above the Earth's atmosphere to reach higher resolution and greater light gathering through longer exposure times. Location in the northern or southern hemisphere of the Earth can also limit what part of the sky can be observed, and climate conditions at the observatory site affect how often the telescope can be used each year.

The combination of large mirrors, locations selected for stable atmosphere and favorable climate conditions, and active optics and adaptive optics to correct for much of atmospheric turbulence allow the largest Earth based telescopes to reach higher resolution than the Hubble Space Telescope. Another advantage of Earth based telescopes is the comparatively low cost of upgrading and replacing instruments.

Comparison of nominal sizes of apertures of some notable optical telescopes

== Table of reflecting telescopes ==
Telescopes in this list are ordered by effective optical aperture, given as the diameter of a circle with equivalent collecting area. Aperture has historically been a useful gauge of telescopes' limiting resolution, optical area, physical size, and cost. Multiple mirror or segmented mirror telescopes that are on the same mount and usually form a single combined image are ranked by their equivalent combined aperture. Telescopes that cannot use their entire primary mirror at once (e.g. HET or LAMOST) are listed by their maximum effective aperture. Telescopes that are sometimes used for optical interferometry are listed individually, not as a combined instrument. All telescopes with an effective aperture of at least 3.00 metres (118 in) at visible or near-infrared wavelengths are included; selected smaller telescopes are listed elsewhere.

Reflecting telescopes
Name	Image	Effective aperture	Mirror type	Nationality / Sponsors	Site	First light
Large Binocular Telescope (LBT)		11.9 m (469 in) (combined)	Multiple; Two 8.4 m (331 in) mirrors	USA, Italy, Germany	Mount Graham International Observatory, Arizona, USA	2005
Gran Telescopio Canarias (GTC)		10.4 m (409 in)	Segmented; 36 hexagonal segments	Spain, Mexico, USA	Roque de los Muchachos Obs., Canary Islands, Spain	2006
Hobby–Eberly Telescope (HET)		10 m (394 in) (effective)	Segmented; 91 × 1 m (39 in) hexagonal segments forming an 11 m × 9.8 m mirror	USA, Germany	McDonald Observatory, Texas, USA	1997; Aperture increased 2015
Keck 1		10 m (394 in)	Segmented; 36 hexagonal segments	USA	Mauna Kea Observatories, Hawaii, USA	1993
Keck 2		10 m (394 in)	Segmented; 36 hexagonal segments	USA	Mauna Kea Observatories, Hawaii, USA	1996
Southern African Large Telescope (SALT)		9.2 m (362 in) (effective)	Segmented; 91 × 1 m (39 in) hexagonal segments forming an 11 m × 9.8 m mirror	South Africa, USA, UK, Germany, Poland, New Zealand	South African Astronomical Obs., Northern Cape, South Africa	2005
Subaru (JNLT)		8.2 m (323 in)	Single	Japan	Mauna Kea Observatories, Hawaii, USA	1999
VLT UT1 – Antu		8.2 m (323 in)	Single	ESO Countries, Chile	Paranal Observatory, Antofagasta Region, Chile	1998
VLT UT2 – Kueyen		8.2 m (323 in)	Single	ESO Countries, Chile	Paranal Observatory, Antofagasta Region, Chile	1999
VLT UT3 – Melipal		8.2 m (323 in)	Single	ESO Countries, Chile	Paranal Observatory, Antofagasta Region, Chile	2000
VLT UT4 – Yepun		8.2 m (323 in)	Single	ESO Countries, Chile	Paranal Observatory, Antofagasta Region, Chile	2001
Gemini North (Gillett)		8.1 m (319 in)	Single	USA, UK, Canada, Chile, Australia, Argentina, Brazil	Mauna Kea Observatories, Hawaii, USA	1999
Gemini South		8.1 m (319 in)	Single	USA, UK, Canada, Chile, Australia, Argentina, Brazil	Cerro Pachón (CTIO), Coquimbo Region, Chile	2001
James Webb Space Telescope		6.5 m (256 in)	Segmented; 18 hexagonal segments	NASA, ESA, CSA	Halo orbit around the Earth-Sun L2 Point	2022
MMT (current optics)		6.5 m (256 in)	Single	USA	F. L. Whipple Obs., Arizona, USA	2000
Magellan 1 (Walter Baade)		6.5 m (256 in)	Single	USA	Las Campanas Obs., Atacama Region, Chile	2000
Magellan 2 (Landon Clay)		6.5 m (256 in)	Single	USA	Las Campanas Obs., Atacama Region, Chile	2002
Tokyo Atacama Observatory (TAO)		6.5 m (256 in)	Single	Japan	Cerro Chajnantor, Atacama Desert, Chile	2024
Simonyi Survey Telescope		6.4 m (252 in) (effective)	Combined primary & tertiary mirror Total diameter 8.4 m (331 in)	USA	Vera C. Rubin Observatory, Coquimbo Region, Chile	2025
BTA-6		6 m (236 in)	Single	USSR/Russia	Special Astrophysical Obs., Karachay–Cherkessia, Russia	1975
Large Zenith Telescope (LZT)		6 m (236 in)	Liquid	Canada, France, United States	Maple Ridge, British Columbia, Canada	2003; Decommissioned 2016
Hale Telescope		5.08 m (200 in)	Single	USA	Palomar Observatory, California, USA	1949
LAMOST		4.9 m (193 in) (effective)	Segmented; 37 segments for the 6.67 m × 6.05 m primary and 24 segments for the 5.72 m × 4.40 m corrector; effective aperture 3.6–4.9 m	China	Beijing Astronomical Obs., Xinglong, China	2008
MMT (original optics) (see above for current version)		4.7 m (185 in) (combined)	Multiple; Six 1.8 m (71 in) mirrors	USA	F. L. Whipple Obs., Arizona, USA	1979; Mirrors removed 1998
Lowell Discovery Telescope		4.3 m (169 in)	Single	USA	Lowell Observatory, Happy Jack, Arizona, USA	2012
William Herschel Telescope		4.2 m (165 in)	Single	UK, Netherlands, Spain	Roque de los Muchachos Obs., Canary Islands, Spain	1987
SOAR		4.1 m (161 in)	Single	USA, Brazil	Cerro Pachón (CTIO), Coquimbo Region, Chile	2002
VISTA		4.1 m (161 in)	Single	ESO Countries, Chile	Paranal Observatory, Antofagasta Region, Chile	2009
Víctor M. Blanco Telescope		4 m (157 in)	Single	USA	Cerro Tololo Inter-American Obs., Coquimbo Region, Chile	1976
International Liquid Mirror Telescope		4 m (157 in)	Liquid	Belgium, Canada, India, Poland	ARIES Devasthal Observatory, Nainital, India	2022
Nicholas U. Mayall 4 m		4 m (157 in)	Single	USA	Kitt Peak National Obs., Arizona, USA	1973
Daniel K. Inouye Solar Telescope		4 m (157 in)	Single	USA	Haleakala Observatory, Hawaii, USA	2019
DAG Telescope		4 m (157 in)	Single	Turkey	Eastern Anatolia Observatory, Erzurum, Turkey	2025
Anglo-Australian Telescope (AAT)		3.89 m (153 in)	Single	Australia, UK	Australian Astronomical Obs., New South Wales, Australia	1974
United Kingdom Infrared Telescope (UKIRT)		3.8 m (150 in)	Single	UK, United States	Mauna Kea Observatories, Hawaii, USA	1979
3.67 m AEOS Telescope (AEOS)		3.67 m (144 in)	Single	USA	Air Force Maui Optical Station, Hawaii, USA	1996
3.6 m Devasthal Optical Telescope (DOT)		3.6 m (142 in)	Single	India	ARIES Devasthal Observatory, Nainital, India	2016
Telescopio Nazionale Galileo (TNG)		3.58 m (141 in)	Single	Italy	Roque de los Muchachos Obs., Canary Islands, Spain	1997
New Technology Telescope (NTT)		3.58 m (141 in)	Single	ESO countries	La Silla Observatory, Coquimbo Region, Chile	1989
Canada-France-Hawaii Telescope (CFHT)		3.58 m (141 in)	Single	Canada, France, USA	Mauna Kea Observatories, Hawaii, USA	1979
ESO 3.6 m Telescope		3.57 m (141 in)	Single	ESO countries	La Silla Observatory, Coquimbo Region, Chile	1977
MPI-CAHA 3.5 m		3.5 m (138 in)	Single	West Germany, Spain	Calar Alto Obs., Almería, Spain	1984
USAF Starfire 3.5 m		3.5 m (138 in)	Single	USA	Starfire Optical Range, New Mexico, USA	1994
WIYN Telescope		3.5 m (138 in)	Single	USA	Kitt Peak National Obs., Arizona, USA	1994
Space Surveillance Telescope		3.5 m (138 in)	Single	USA, Australia	White Sands Missile Range, New Mexico, United States; Relocated to Harold E. Holt Naval Communication Station, Western Australia, Australia	2011; Relocated; 2020
Astrophysical Research Consortium (ARC)		3.48 m (137 in)	Single	USA	Apache Point Obs., New Mexico, USA	1994
Iranian National Observatory (INO340)		3.4 m (130 in)	Single	Iran	Mount Gargash, Isfahan Province, Iran	2022
Shane Telescope		3.05 m (120 in)	Single	USA	Lick Observatory, California, USA	1959
NASA Infrared Telescope Facility		3.0 m (118 in)	Single	USA	Mauna Kea Observatory, Hawaii, USA	1979
NASA-LMT		3 m (118 in)	Liquid	USA	NASA Orbital Debris Obs., New Mexico, USA	1995; Decommissioned 2002
For continuation of this list, see List of large optical reflecting telescopes

== Chronological list of largest telescopes ==
These telescopes were the largest in the world at the time of their construction, by the same aperture criterion as above.

Reflecting telescopes (chronologically)
Years Largest	Name	Out	In	Aperture (m)	Area (m^{2})	M1 Mirror	Note	Altitude (m)
2009–Present	Gran Telescopio Canarias			10.4	74	36 × 1.9 m hexagons M1 mirror	Segmented mirror	2267
1993–2009	Keck 1			10	76	36 × 1.8 m hexagons M1 mirror	Segmented mirror, M1 f/1.75	4145
1976–1993	BTA-6			6	26	605 cm f/4 M1 mirror	Mirror replaced twice	2070
1948–1976	Hale (200 inch)			5.1	–	508 cm f/3.3 M1 mirror		1713
1917–1948	Hooker (100 inch)			2.54	–		Also used for 1st optical interferometer	1742
For earlier entries, see List of largest optical telescopes historically

Large reflecting telescopes over time. The horizontal axis indicates the year built and the vertical axis is the size of the mirror measured in meters. Selected countries are color-coded (see legend).

== Future telescopes ==
=== Under construction ===
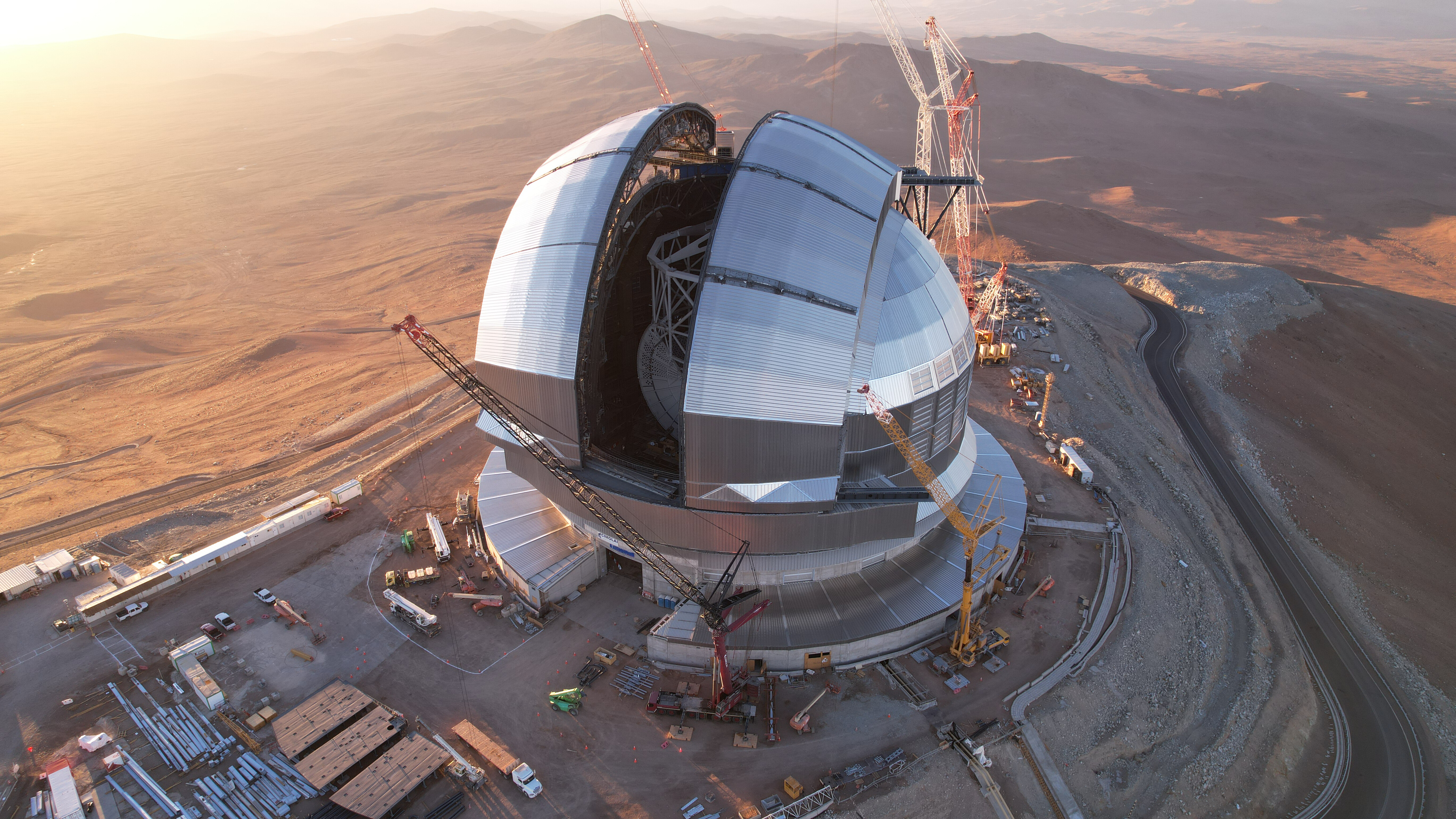
The Extremely Large Telescope under construction in April 2026

These telescopes are under construction and will meet the list inclusion criteria once completed:

- Extremely Large Telescope, Chile – 39.5 m (1,560 in). Construction began in 2018, first light planned in 2029.
- Thirty Meter Telescope, Hawaii, USA – 30 m (1,200 in). Construction began in 2014 but halted in 2015; as of 2025 it has not resumed.
- Giant Magellan Telescope, Chile – seven 8.4 m mirrors on a single mount. This provides an effective aperture equivalent to a 21.4 m mirror and the resolving power equivalent to a 24.5 m mirror. First light planned in 2029.
- San Pedro Martir Telescope, Baja California, Mexico – 6.5 m (260 in). First light planned in 2023.
- Magdalena Ridge Observatory Interferometer, New Mexico, USA – An optical interferometer array with ten 1.4 m (55 in) telescopes. The light gathering power is equivalent to a 4.4 m (170 in) single aperture. The first telescope was installed in 2016; construction was paused in 2019 due to insufficient funding and resumed in 2021.
- Timau National Observatory, Indonesia – 3.8 m (150 in). Construction expected to be completed by early 2025.

=== Proposed ===
Selected large telescopes which are in detailed design or pre-construction phases:

- Habitable Worlds Observatory (LUVOIR), a proposed space telescope for launch in the early 2040s.
- MUltiplexed Survey Telescope (MUST), a 6.5 m spectroscopic survey telescope.
- Chinese Giant Solar Telescope (CGST), an infrared and optical solar telescope, with light-gathering power equivalent to a 5 m diameter aperture.

== See also ==
- List of largest infrared telescopes
- List of telescope types
- Lists of telescopes
