= Merate Astronomical Observatory =

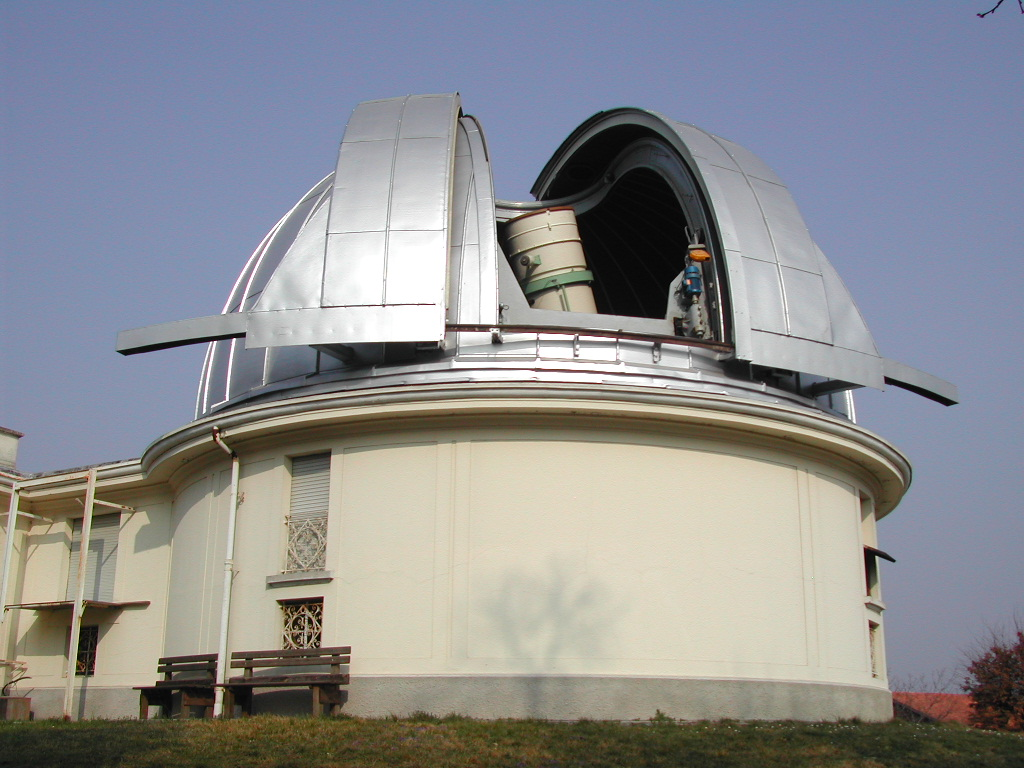
- Observatory code: 096
- Location: Merate, Province of Lecco, Lombardy, Italy
- Coordinates: 45°42′22″N 9°25′42″E
- Altitude: 362 m (1,188 ft)
- Established: 1923
- Website: www.merate.mi.astro.it

Telescopes
- Zeiss di Merate: 1 meter Zeiss
- Location of Merate Astronomical Observatory
- Related media on Commons

Merate Astronomical Observatory is an old observatory in Merate (Lecco), Italy. It has housed a 1-meter Zeiss telescope since 1926.

This Zeiss di Merate is a reflecting telescope on an equatorial mount and is one of the largest telescopes funded by the Regno d'Italia ("Kingdom of Italy") before Italy became republic in 1946.

The same type of Zeiss telescope was also installed at the Hamburg-Bergedorf Observatory and the Royal Observatory of Belgium.

== Gallery ==
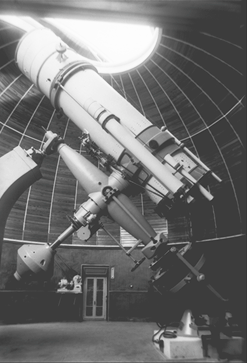
The Zeiss telescope

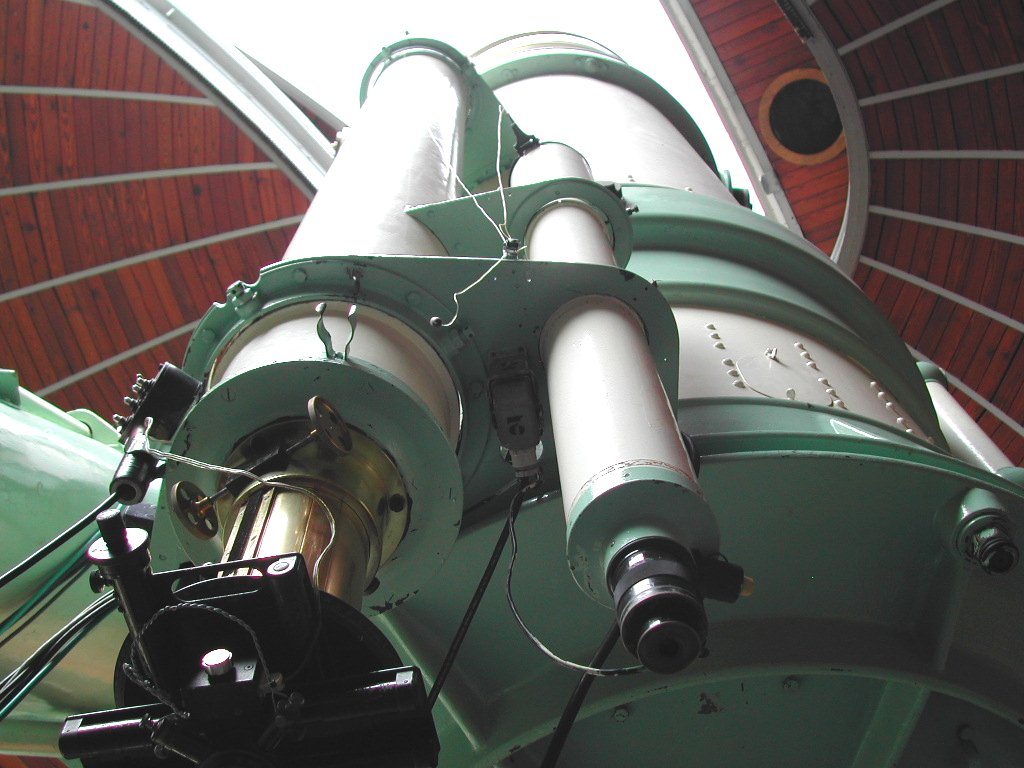
View of the main and the refracting guide telescopes with finder

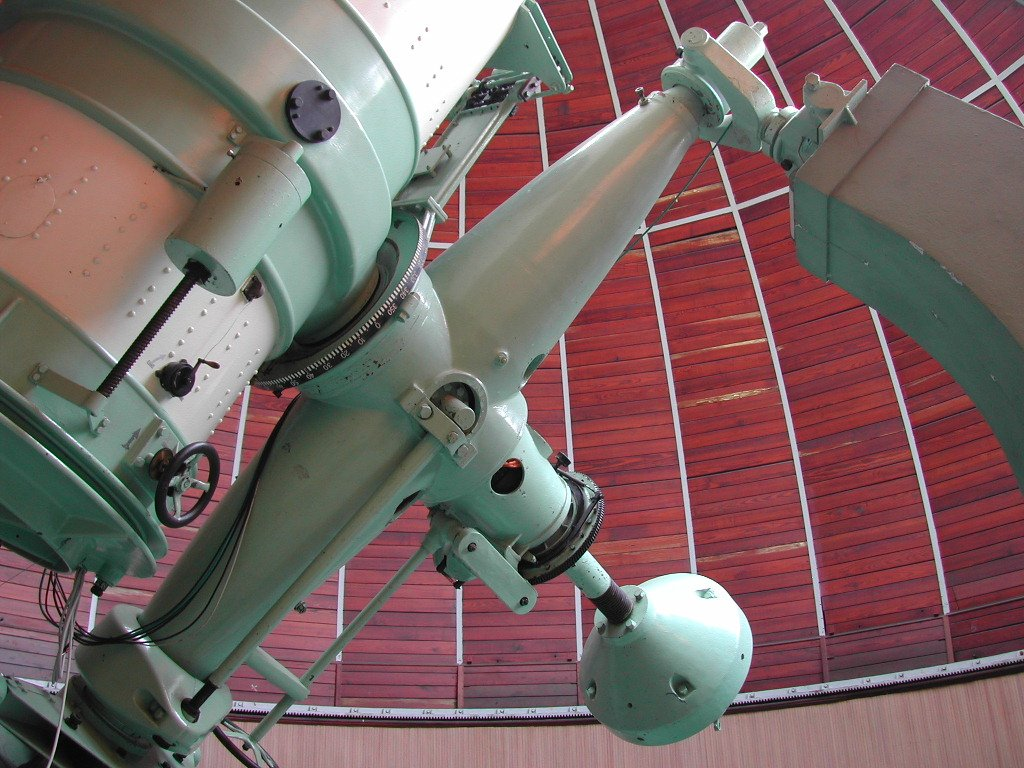
Right Ascension and Declination axes

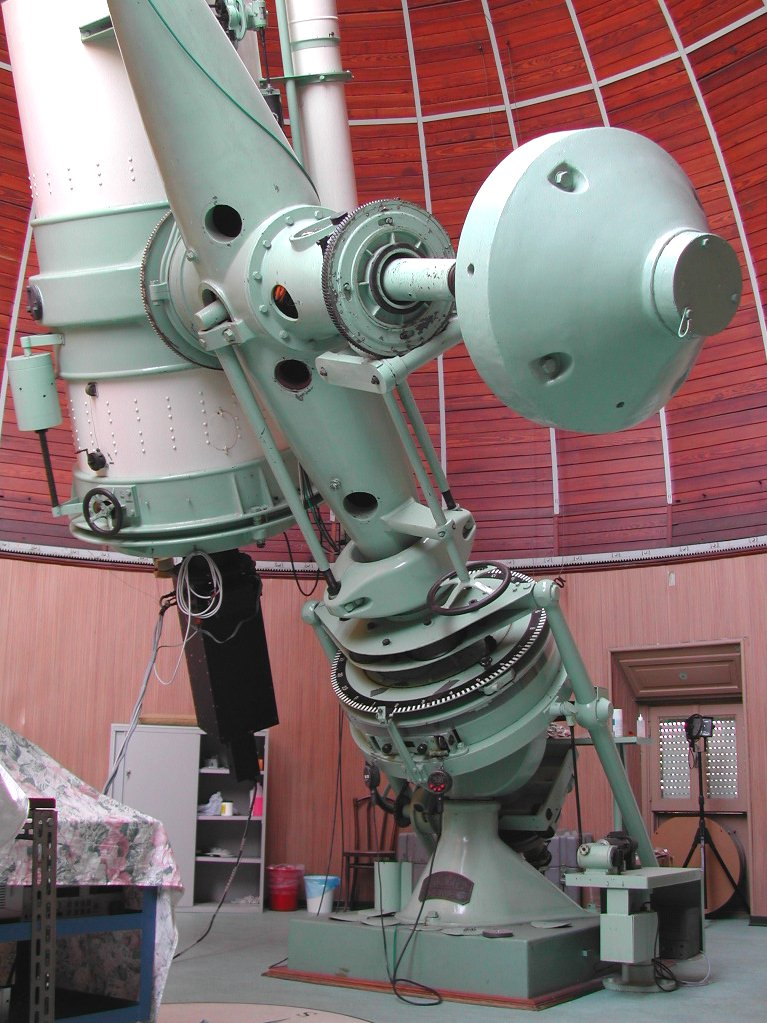
South pillar and part of the Right Ascension axis

== See also ==
- Asiago Astrophysical Observatory
- Galileo National Telescope, 3.5m (138 inch) diameter aperture Italian National telescope.
- List of astronomical observatories
- List of largest optical reflecting telescopes
- List of largest optical telescopes in the 20th century
- Telescope mount
