= Eastern Anatolia Observatory =

Eastern Anatolia Observatory Doğu Anadolu Gozlemevi
- Alternative names: DAG
- Organization: Astrophysics Research and Application Center, Atatürk University
- Location: Karakaya, Erzurum, Turkey
- Coordinates: 39°47′N 41°14′E
- Altitude: 3,170 m (10,400 ft)
- Website: https://atasam.atauni.edu.tr/

Eastern Anatolia Observatory (Turkish: Doğu Anadolu Gözlemevi, shortly DAG) is a 4-meter telescope, ground-based astronomical observatory of Atatürk University in Erzurum, Turkey.

The project to establish an observatory in Erzurum is conducted by the Astrophysics Research and Application Center of Atatürk University with the scientific and technical coordination of TÜBİTAK National Observatory and financial support of the Ministry of Development, Government of Erzurum Province, 40 universities and seven observatories in the region. It is the country's biggest project for astronomy, astrophysics and space science.

The observatory will be built on a land of 2,500 decares (2.5 km^{2}; 0.97 sq mi) atop Karakaya Hill at 3,170 m (10,400 ft) above sea level within the Konaklı Ski Resort 25 km (16 mi) south of Erzurum. It will host Turkey's first infrared telescope. The telescope will have an active primary mirror of 4 m (13 ft) in diameter and will be equipped with adaptive optics (AO) technology. The contract for the construction of the telescope has been awarded to the Belgian company AMOS in 2014. The request for tender for the design and construction of the rotating hemispherical dome to house the large telescope was won by the Italian company EIE Group Srl in November 2015. The completion of the observatory is scheduled for end 2019.

The 4 meter telescope reached technical first light in 2024, and completed initial testing in September 2025.
