= Asiago Astrophysical Observatory =

Observatory at the University of Padua in Italy

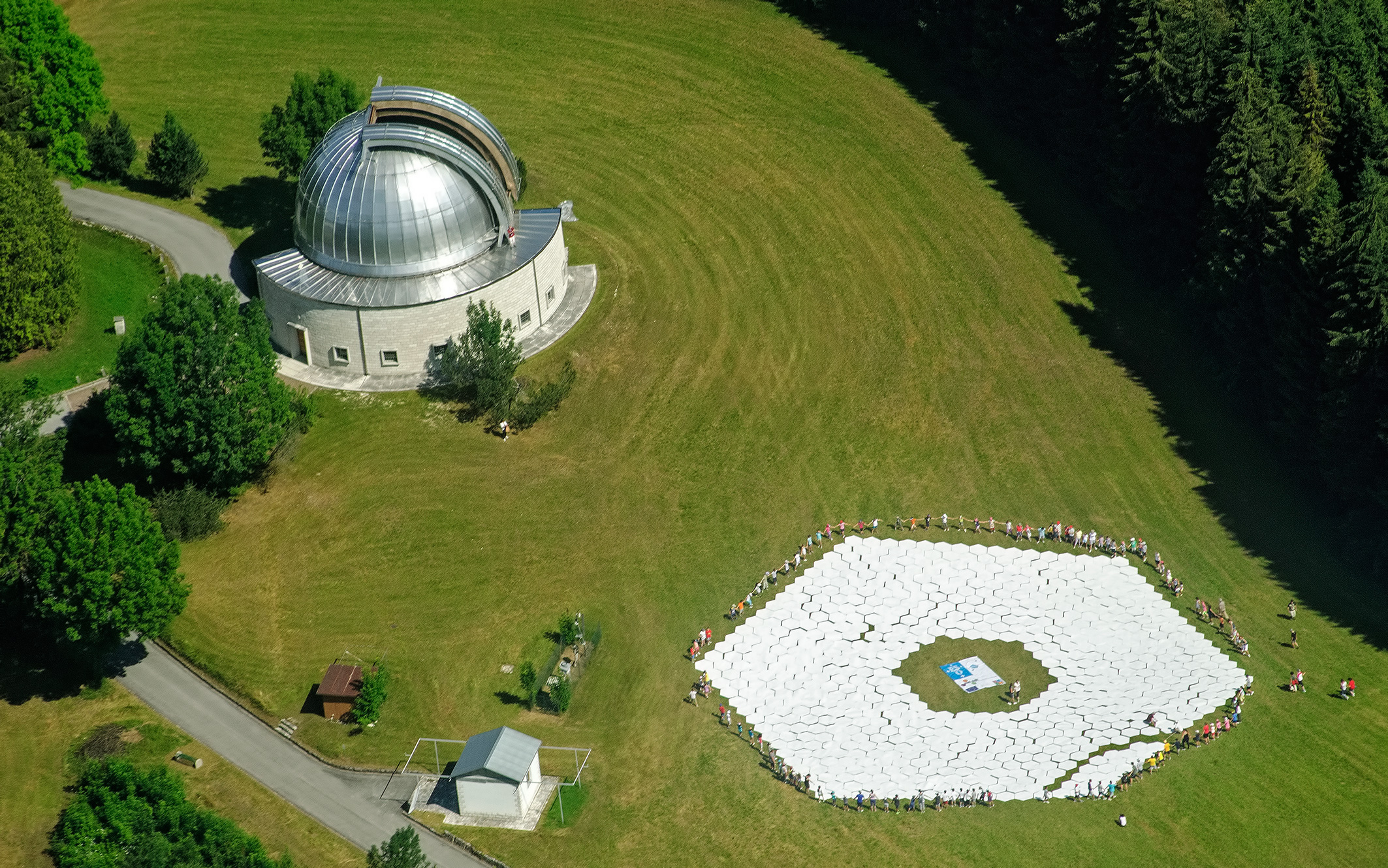
- Organization: University of Padua
- Observatory code: 043
- Location: Asiago, Province of Vicenza, Veneto, Italy
- Coordinates: 45°51′59″N 11°31′34″E
- Altitude: 1,045 m (3,428 ft)
- Established: 1942
- Website: www.astro.unipd.it/inglese/observatory/telescopio_en.html
- Telescopes: Museo degli strumenti dell'astronomia
- Related media on Commons

The Asiago Astrophysical Observatory (Osservatorio Astrofisico di Asiago, or Asiago Observatory for short) is an Italian astronomical observatory (IAU code 043) owned and operated by the University of Padua. Founded in 1942, and for a long time the biggest telescope in Europe, it is located on the plateau of Asiago, 90 kilometers northwest of Padua, near the town of Asiago. Its main instrument is the 1.22-meter Galilei telescope, currently used only for spectrometric observations.

The observatory saw the construction of a 1:1 scale model of the European Extremely Large Telescope's primary mirror.

== Cima Ekar Observing Station ==
The nearby Cima Ekar Observing Station (Italian: Stazione osservativa di Asiago Cima Ekar) is located approximately 3.8 kilometers to the southeast on Mount Ekar, and hosts the biggest optical telescope on Italian soil. It has the observatory code 098. Cima Ekar also participates in the Asiago-DLR Asteroid Survey, a prominent international dedicated programme to search and follow-up asteroids and comets, with special emphasis on near-Earth objects.

== See also ==
- Merate Astronomical Observatory
- Telescopio Nazionale Galileo (TNG), 3.5m (138 inch) diameter aperture Italian National telescope.
- List of astronomical observatories
- List of largest optical reflecting telescopes
