= National Astronomical Observatory (Mexico) =

Observatory in Baja California, Mexico

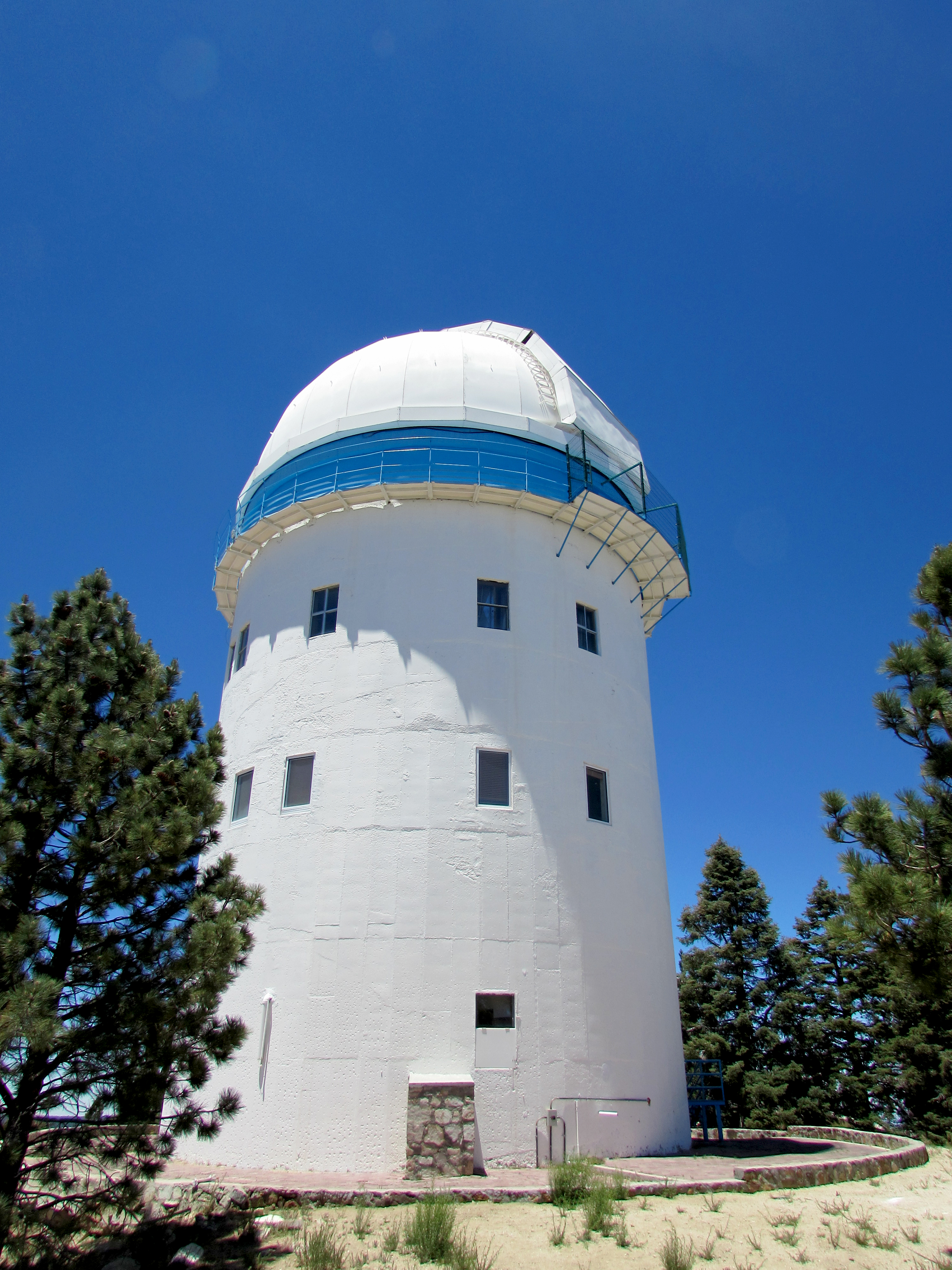
- Dome of the 2.1 m telescope on San Pedro Mártir
- Organization: National Autonomous University of Mexico
- Observatory code: 679
- Location: Sierra San Pedro Mártir, Baja California state, Northwestern Mexico.
- Coordinates: 31.0439°N 115.4637°W
- Altitude: 2,800 meters (9,200 ft)
- Established: 1878
- Website: OAN SPM

Telescopes
- unnamed telescope: 2.1 m reflector
- unnamed telescope: 1.5 m reflector
- unnamed telescope: 0.8 m reflector
- Related media on Commons

The National Astronomical Observatory (Spanish: Observatorio Astronómico Nacional—OAN) is an astronomical observatory in Baja California, Mexico.

== History ==
=== Mexico City ===
The observatory was first established on the balcony of Chapultepec Castle in Mexico City in 1878. The observatory has been operated by the National Autonomous University of Mexico (UNAM) since 1929.

It was later moved to Palacio del Ex-Arzobispado in Tacubaya, then on the outskirts of the city on the west side of the Federal District. The location is remembered by the name Metro Observatorio, the terminal station of the Line 1 of the Mexico City Metro located nearby.

=== Puebla ===
In the middle of the 20th century, OAN had to move from the increasingly crowded and polluted Valley of Mexico, to Tonantzintla in Puebla state, Central Mexico.

=== Baja California ===
In 1967 excessive air pollution and night light pollution caused another move, from Puebla to atop the Sierra San Pedro Mártir mountain range of Baja California state in Northwestern Mexico. The San Pedro Mártir OAN site has been found to have excellent astronomical seeing.

== Telescopes ==
=== Current ===
There are six optical telescopes on the summit of the Sierra San Pedro Mártir at the OAN complex:

- The 2.12 m (83 in) telescope was built between 1974 and 1979 and is tied as Mexico's largest optical telescope. It has a Ritchey-Chrétien (RC) design, with secondary mirrors of f/7.5, f/13.5 or f/30. Direct imaging and optical spectroscopy are performed with a number of different charge-coupled devices and spectrographs.
- The 1.52 m (60 in) telescope was built by the University of Arizona (UA) Lunar and Planetary Laboratory (LPL). It was installed in 1970 with the assistance of LPL. It has an RC design, and direct imaging, optical spectroscopy, and photometry are done with a f/13.5 secondary mirror.
- The 1.3 m COLIBRI robotic telescope, built in conjunction with the SVOM mission, is a collaboration between France and Mexico designed to image gamma-ray bursts and other transient phenomena. It began operations in September 2024.
- The 1.0 m SAINT-EX telescope, which is the result of a collaboration between UNAM and the Universities of Bern (CH), Liège (BE), Cambridge (UK) and Geneva (CH). SAINT-EX's main scientific goal is to search for terrestrial planets orbiting ultra-cool stars such as TRAPPIST-1. SAINT-EX has started operations in Spring 2019.
- The 0.84 m (33 in) telescope was loaned to UNAM by UA in the late 1960s and was the first to be installed at the site. It has an RC design, and direct imaging, optical spectroscopy, and photometry are done with a f/15 secondary mirror.
- The 0.6 m (24 in) Javier Gorosabel Telescope is the fifth telescope in the BOOTES network. It has an f/8 RC design, and began operations in 2015. The BOOTES-5 project is a collaboration between the Institute of Astronomy of the National Autonomous University of Mexico (UNAM), the Institute of Astrophysics of Andalusia (IAA), Spain, and the Sungkyunkwan University (SKKU) in South Korea.
- The 0.5 m (20 in) COATLI telescope is a collaboration between the UNAM Institute of Astronomy and Arizona State University. It began operations in 2016 and has an f/8 RC design.
- The Deca-Degree Optical Transient Imager (DDOTI) will consist of six 28 cm (11 in) f/2.2 Celestron Rowe-Ackermann Schmidt Astrographs on a single mount, two of which became operational in 2017. This project is a collaboration between the UNAM Institute of Astronomy, Arizona State University, the University of Maryland, the Laboratoire d'Astrophysique de Marseille, and the Haute-Provence Observatory.

=== Under construction ===
Construction has begun on the new San Pedro Martir Telescope (SPMT), a large infrared survey telescope at the OAN complex, with first light planned for the 2017–2020 period. Mirror fabrication for the SPMT began in 2009, with a 6.5 m aperture optimized for wide angle infrared survey work. The primary instrument would be a 124 x 2k x 2k pixel infrared detector array with a 1 degree FOV prosecuting the Synoptic All-Sky Infrared Survey (SASIR), a four-year, deep all-sky survey. As of November 2017, the project is still awaiting funding, but construction is expected to be completed by 2023.

== See also ==
- Astronomical observatories in Mexico
- Guillermo Haro Observatory
- List of astronomical observatories
