= Guillermo Haro Observatory =

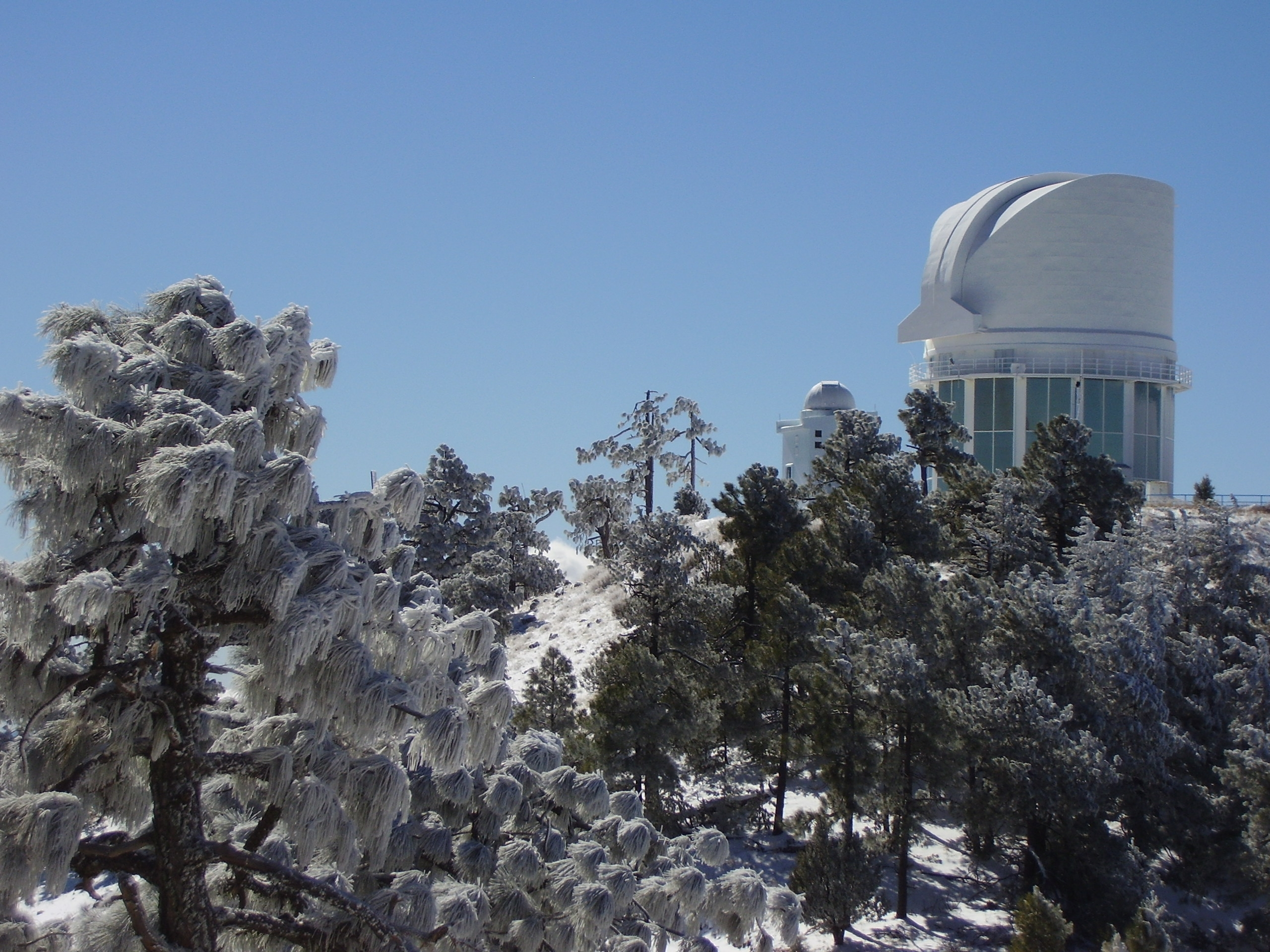
- Guillermo Haro Astrophysics Observatory, in Cananea, Mexico.
- Named after: Guillermo Haro
- Organization: INAOE
- Location: Cananea Municipality, Sonora, Mexico
- Coordinates: 31°3′10″N 110°23′5″W
- Altitude: 2,480 metres (8,140 ft)
- Weather: 75% clear
- Established: 1972
- Website: Observatorio Astrofísico Guillermo Haro

Telescopes
- unnamed telescope: 2.12 m reflector
- unnamed telescope: 0.41 m reflector

The Guillermo Haro Observatory (Spanish: Observatorio Astrofísico Guillermo Haro - OAGH) is an astronomical observatory owned and operated by the National Institute of Astrophysics, Optics and Electronics (Spanish: Instituto Nacional de Astrofísica, Óptica y Electrónica - INAOE) in Cananea Municipality in the Mexican state of Sonora. It is located 13 km (8.1 miles) north of Cananea and 85 km (53 miles) south-east of Mount Hopkins. It is named after Professor Guillermo Haro.

== Telescopes ==
The main telescope at the observatory is Ritchey-Chretein design with a 2.12 m (83 in) primary mirror and a 0.5 m (20 in) secondary mirror. Four different instruments are available to be mounted at the Cassegrain focus. Planning for the telescope began in 1972, but it was not dedicated until 1987. Routine operations began in 1992.

The observatory has a 0.41 m (16 in) Schmidt-Cassegrain reflector built by Meade Instruments on an equatorial mount located in a separate dome. It is used to make atmospheric extinction measurements and to monitor light pollution.

== See also ==
- National Astronomical Observatory (Mexico)
- List of astronomical observatories
