= TÜBİTAK National Observatory =

TÜBİTAK National Observatory - Turkish National Observatories TÜBITAK Ulusal Gözlemevi - Türkiye Ulusal Gözlemevleri
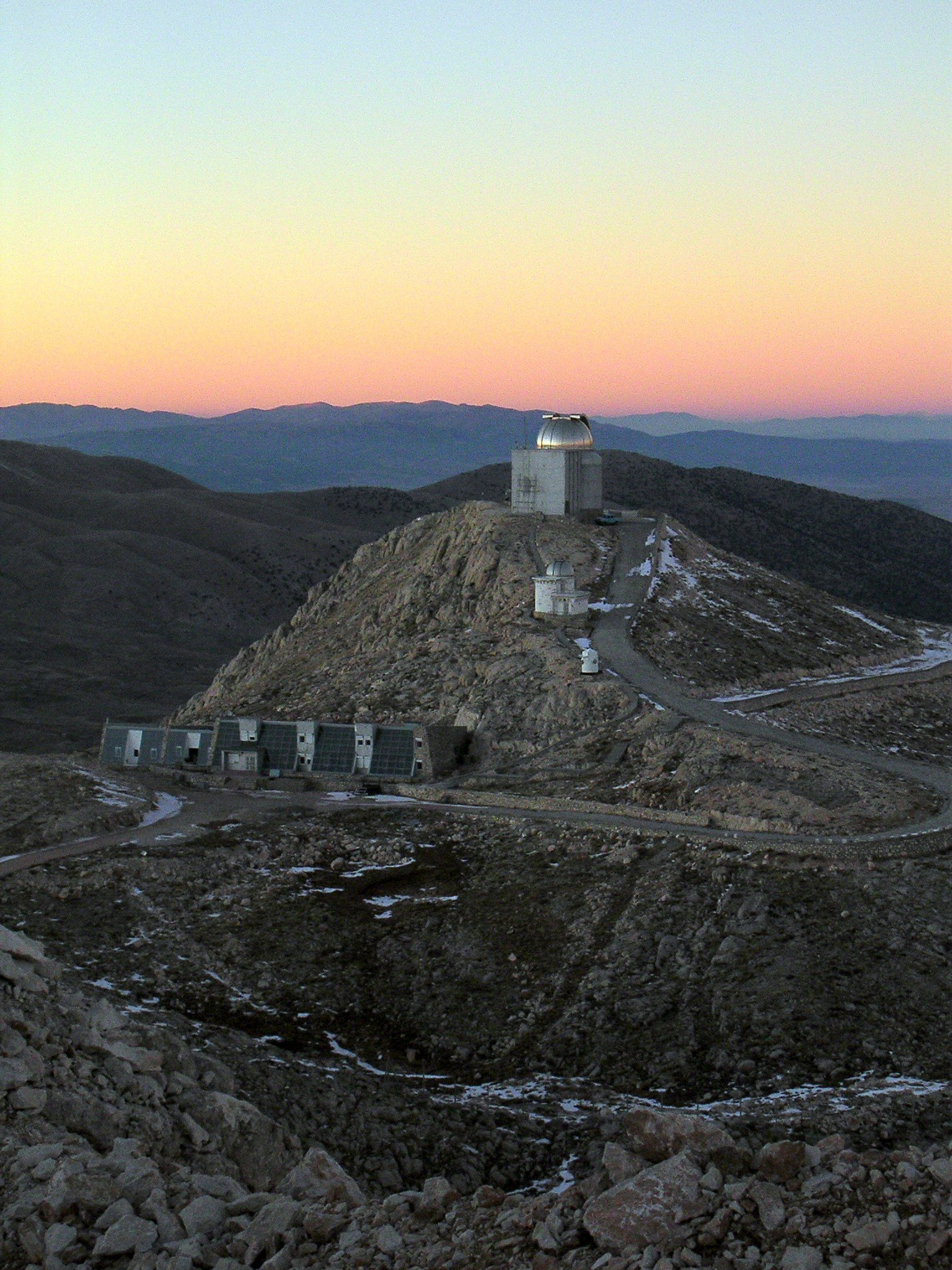
- TÜBİTAK National Observatory at Bakırtepe, Antalya Province, Turkey
- Organization: Turkish National Observatories
- Observatory code: A84
- Location: Bakırtepe, Antalya, Turkey
- Coordinates: 36°49′27″N 30°20′8″E
- Altitude: 2,450 m (8,040 ft)
- Established: 5 September 1997
- Website: trgozlemevleri.gov.tr/yerleskeler/antalya-tug/

Telescopes
- RTT150: Cassegrain
- T100 (ACE RC1.0): Ritchey–Chrétien
- T60 (OMI RC06): Ritchey–Chrétien
- YT40 (Meade LX200GPS): Schmidt–Cassegrain
- ROTSEIIID: Robotic Optical Transient Search Experiment
- Related media on Commons

Turkish National Observatories (Turkish: TÜBİTAK Ulusal Gözlemevi - Türkiye Ulusal Gözlemevleri, TUG) is a ground-based astronomical observatory operated by the TUG Turkish National Observatories. Established in 1991, it is located at an altitude of 2,450 m (8,040 ft) in Bakırtepe, around 50 km (31 mi) west-southwest of Antalya in southern Turkey.

There are five telescopes installed in Bakırtepe:

- RTT150 - Russian-Turkish 1.5-m Telescope (formerly AZT-22) (2001)
- T100 (ACE RC1.0) - 1.0 m Ritchey–Chrétien telescope (2009)
- T60 (OMI RC06) - 0.6 m Ritchey–Chrétien telescope (2008)
- YT40 (Meade LX200GPS) - 0.4 m Schmidt–Cassegrain telescope (2006)
- ROTSEIIID Robotic Optical Transient Search Experiment

== Discoveries ==
Scientists led by a Turkish astronomer from Ankara University discovered an exoplanet orbiting the giant star HD 208897, which is located at a distance of some 210 light years from the Earth. The exoplanet has a minimum mass of 1.4 Jupiter masses, and rotates its parent star from about 1.05 AU (156,000,000 km (97,000,000 mi)) away in every 353 days on a nearly circular orbit. The discovery is the result of a ten-year-long research work of precise radial-velocity method carried out by using the Coude Echelle Spectrograph (CES) installed on the 1.5-meter Russian-Turkish Telescope (RTT150). Follow-up observations at the Okayama Astrophysical Observatory (OAO) in Japan and the Ankara University Kreiken Observatory (AUKR) confirmed the discovery, which was made public on August 6, 2017.
