= Mayall =

Mayall may refer to:

People with the surname Mayall:

- James Mayall (1856–1916), British cricketer
- John Mayall (1933–2024), British blues singer
- John Jabez Edwin Mayall (1813–1901), British photographer
- Margaret Mayall (1902–1995), American astronomer
- Nicholas U. Mayall (1906–1993), American observational astronomer
- Rik Mayall (1958–2014), British comedian and actor
- Samuel Mayall (1816–1892), Thirty-third Congress Representative from Maine

== Astronomical objects and related ==
- Mayall II, Mayall III, Mayall IV, Mayall V, and Mayall VI globular clusters in the Andromeda Galaxy
- Mayall's Object, or Arp 148, a peculiar galaxy, or pair of colliding galaxies
- 2131 Mayall, a minor planet
- Nicholas U. Mayall Telescope, telescope at the Kitt Peak National Observatory
