= RW Tauri =

Eclipsing binary star in the constellation Taurus

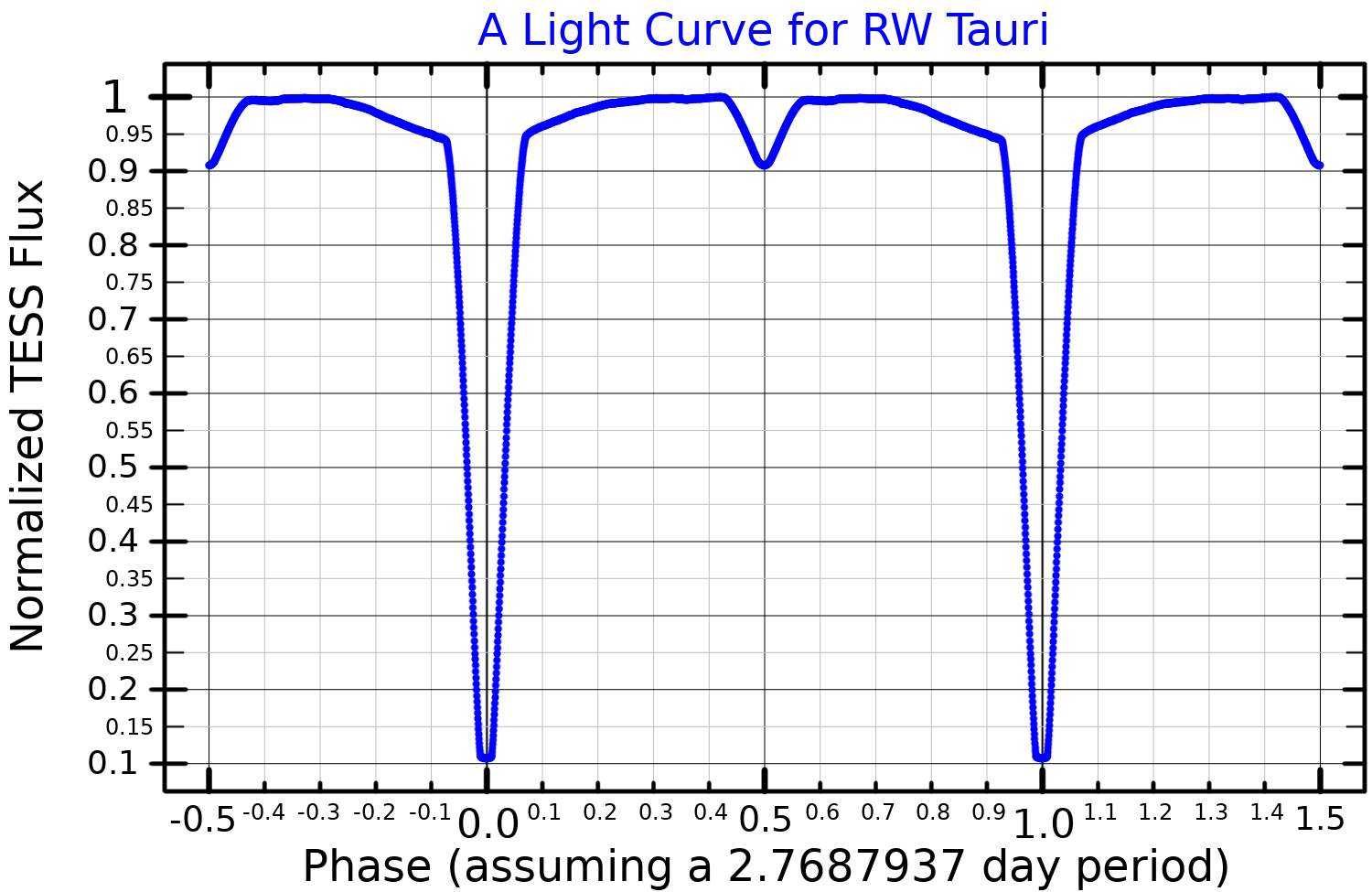
- A light curve for RW Tauri, plotted from TESS data

Observation data Epoch J2000.0 Equinox ICRS
- Constellation: Taurus
- Right ascension: 04^{h} 03^{m} 54.316^{s}
- Declination: +28° 07′ 33.49″
- Apparent magnitude (V): 7.98 - 11.59

Characteristics
- Spectral type: B8Ve + K0IV
- B−V color index: 0.079±0.015
- Variable type: Algol (semidetached)

Astrometry
Proper motion (μ)	RA: 0.271 mas/yr Dec.: −18.651 mas/yr
Parallax (π)	3.4691±0.0428 mas
Distance	940 ± 10 ly (288 ± 4 pc)

Orbit
Period (P)	2.7688439 d
Semi-major axis (a)	11.94 R_{☉}
Eccentricity (e)	0.293±0.037
Inclination (i)	90°
Argument of periastron (ω) (secondary)	36.45±5.57°
Semi-amplitude (K_{1}) (primary)	53.34±1.74 km/s

Details

Mass gaining star
Mass	2.43 M_{☉}
Radius	2.27 R_{☉}
Luminosity	83 L_{☉}
Surface gravity (log g)	3.85 cgs
Temperature	11,560 K
Rotational velocity (v sin i)	94 km/s
Age	20.0±17.2 Myr

Donor star
Mass	0.55 M_{☉}
Radius	3.00 R_{☉}
Luminosity	2.81 L_{☉}
Temperature	4,330 K
Rotational velocity (v sin i)	88 km/s

Other designations
- RW Tau, BD+27°623, HD 25487, HIP 18972, SAO 76418, PPM 93202, WDS J04039+2808AB

Database references
SIMBAD	data

RW Tauri is a binary star system in the equatorial constellation of Taurus. It has the designation HD 25487 in the Henry Draper Catalogue, while RW Tauri is the variable star designation. With a peak apparent visual magnitude of 8.05, it is too faint to be visible to the naked eye. The distance to this system is approximately 940 light years based on parallax measurements.

This system was reported as an eclipsing binary by H. Shapley in 1913, who found a period of 2.769 days and a magnitude change of 3.42 during the primary eclipse. A light curve of the eclipse was generated by H. N. Russell and associates in 1917. Measurements by L. Binnendijk in 1941 suggested the system consisted of a hot component with a class of A0 in orbit with a cooler, larger star with a K0 class. He derived an orbital inclination of 86.95°±0.15° to the line of sight from the Earth, and showed that the times of the eclipse minimum appeared to vary on a cycle. Velocity measurements allowed W. A. Hiltner and R. H. Hardie to publish orbital elements for the system in 1949. Longer term observations of the system demonstrated that period variation is not periodic but occurs with abrupt changes, ruling out a third body in the system.

In 1934, A. B. Wyse found varying emission lines in the spectrum. A. H. Joy in 1947 discovered these are paired emission lines with Doppler shifts of 350 km/s. The lines originate from a ring around the smaller, hotter component in the system. Both the star and the ring are completely occulted during an eclipse. The variation of the emission lines was confirmed, suggesting an uneven distribution of matter. The disk is the result of Roche lobe overflow from the larger component. It is no more than 1.5 times the radius of the hotter star and is rotating more slowly than orbital velocity, leading to an in-fall of gas.

This is a semi-detached binary with a period of 2.7688439 days as of 2020, and an orbital eccentricity of 0.3. During the primary eclipse the visual magnitude of the system decreases by 3.61 (i.e. at minimum it is only 4% as bright as at maximum) while the secondary eclipse decreases the magnitude by 0.11. The primary eclipse is the deepest known among eclipsing binaries. The primary component is a B-type main-sequence star with a stellar classification of B8Ve, where the 'e' indicates emission lines. The larger secondary is a more evolved subgiant star with a class of K0IV.

In 1947, a faint, magnitude 12.5 companion was detected by A. H. Joy at an angular separation of ~1″ from the pair, and this was confirmed by other observers. A 1993 study failed to detect this object, but Gaia records a magnitude 12.5 star just under 2″ from RW Tauri.
