= Andrew Ainslie Common =

English astronomer

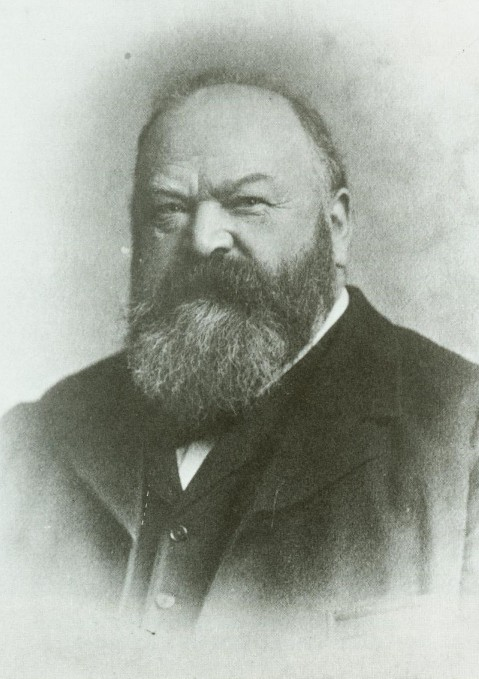
- Andrew Ainslie Common
- Born: 7 August 1841; Newcastle Upon Tyne
- Died: 2 June 1903 (aged 61)
- Citizenship: English
- Known for: astrophotography
- Scientific career
- Fields: Astronomy

Andrew Ainslie Common FRS (1841–1903) was an English amateur astronomer best known for his pioneering work in astrophotography.

== Biography ==
Common was born in Newcastle Upon Tyne on 7 August 1841. His father, Thomas Common, a surgeon known for his treatment of cataract, died when Andrew was a child, forcing him to go early into the world of work. In the 1860s he teamed up with an uncle in the sanitary engineering firm of Matthew Hall and Company. He married in 1867. In 1890 he retired from Matthew Hall. Andrew Ainslie Common died of heart failure 2 June 1903.

== Work in astronomy ==
Although Common's professional career was in the field of sanitary engineering, he is most noted for the work he did as an amateur in the field of astronomy. As a child Andrew showed interest in astronomy. At age 10 his mother borrowed a telescope for him to use from a local doctor, Dr. Bates of Morpeth. He returned to astronomy in his 30s when he took up experimenting with gelatin plate photography of the moon and planets with a 5 1/2 inches (14 cm) refracting telescope.

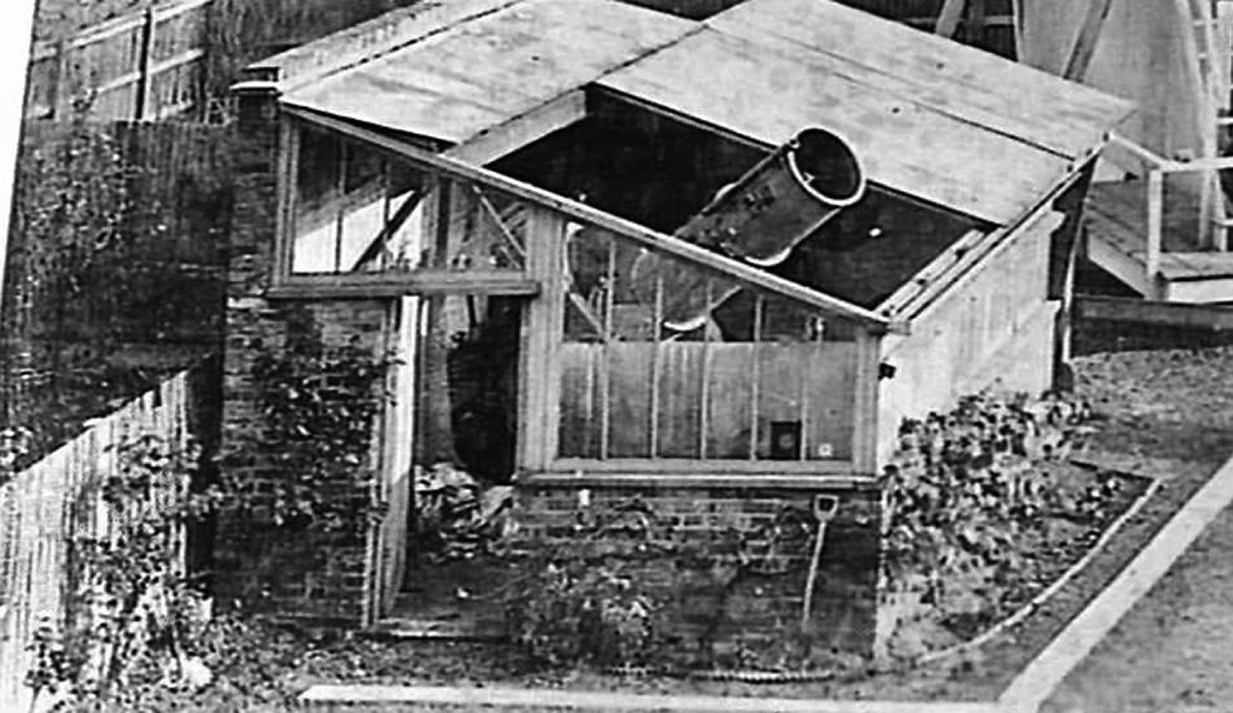
Common's 18-inch reflector in his garden shed in the 1870s at his house in Ealing

In 1876 Common became a Fellow of the Royal Astronomical Society. About this time he also moved to Ealing outside London where he would live for the rest of his life operating an astronomical observatory from the back garden of his house. Common realised he would need very large telescopes to gather enough light to record the images of stars photographically so he began building a series of ever larger Newtonian reflecting telescopes using the then new technology of silver coated glass mirrors. For the first of these, a telescope of his own design constructed in 1876, he tried to grind and polish his own 17 inch mirror but gave up on the idea and ordered an 18-inch (46 cm) mirror from George Calver of Chelmsford. In 1877 and 1878 he published several articles on his visual observations of the satellites of Mars and Saturn. In 1896 Common joined the British Astronomical Association.

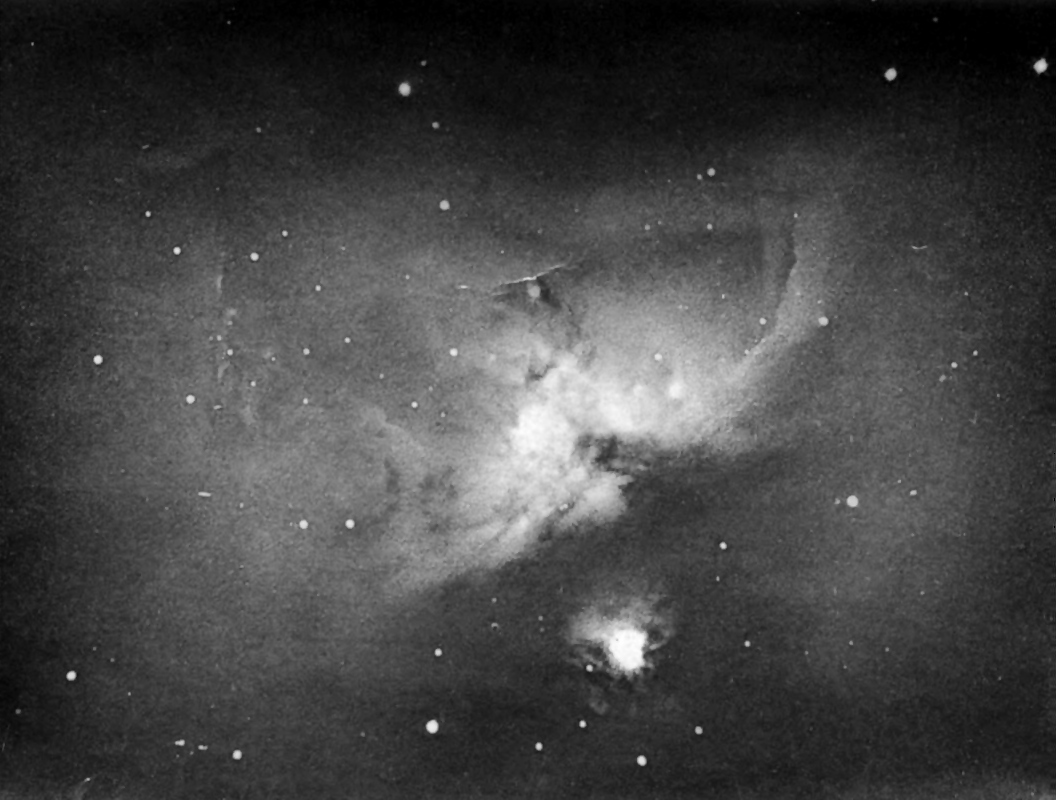
Common's photograph of the Orion Nebula, for which he won the Royal Astronomical Society's Gold Medal

The 36-inch reflector

In 1879 he bought a new 36-inch (910 mm) mirror from Calver to mount in a larger Newtonian reflecting telescope he was building. He used it to make further observations of satellites of Mars and Saturn, and was able to see Saturn's moon Mimas and show that the ephemeris of its orbit was incorrect. With this instrument he also obtained a photograph of a comet in 1881, C/1881 K1. His most notable work with this telescope were the long time exposures he made of the Orion Nebula between 1880 and 1884. His 1883 photograph of that nebula for the first time showed photography's ability to record stars and other features invisible to the human eye. Common noted of his own photographs that:

"although some details are lost in the enlargement, sufficient remains to show that we are approaching the time where a photograph will give us the means to recording in its own inimitable way the shape of a nebula and the relative brightness different parts, in a better manner than the most careful hand drawing".

These pictures earned Common the Gold Medal of the Royal Astronomical Society in 1884. Common eventually sold the 36-inch reflector to British politician Edward Crossley who gave it to Lick Observatory in 1895, becoming the Crossley telescope at that observatory.

The 60-inch reflector

In 1885 Common embarked on building a 60-inch (150 cm) Newtonian reflecting telescope. He chose to buy the raw glass blank and do the grinding and polishing himself. The first mirror he made performed poorly, showing an elliptical deformation of the stars, causing him to fabricate a second mirror in 1890. After a near fall from the high staging needed to reach the Newtonian focus of the telescope Common decided to convert the telescope to a Cassegrain configuration for safer use. To avoid having to bore a hole in the 60 inch primary mirror he mounted a diagonal flat mirror just in front of it to bring the image out to a focus at the lower side of the telescope. He was not satisfied with how this configuration worked and that, combined with his attention being diverted to other projects and the ever more light polluted skies west of London, meant the telescope fell into disuse. After Common's death the telescope with its two 60 inch mirrors and other secondary optics was purchased from his estate and installed at the Harvard College Observatory. In the 1933 the primary mirror was re-figured and a new mount built. It was then set up as the 1.5-meter Boyden-UFS reflector (also called the "60-inch Rockefeller") at Boyden Observatory in South Africa.

== Other projects ==
Dr. Common was largely retired by 1890 and devoted himself full-time to optical design and construction until his death. Most of his time was spent in the design of telescopic and optical sights for the Royal Navy and the Royal Artillery, in which work he was a pioneer. Captain (later Admiral Sir) Percy Scott, one of the leading gunnery officers of the Royal Navy, stated in 1902 that Dr. Common had "...produced (that is "designed") a telescope sight which would, when properly used, quadruple the fighting efficiency of our battleships".

In response to problems of rifle aiming and accuracy revealed in the 2nd Anglo-Boer War, he designed an experimental short telescopic sight for the Lee–Enfield rifle, on a removable offset mounting graduated up to 2000 yards range, which anticipated several features used on many later military rifle 'scopes.

He also pioneered techniques in producing large optical flat mirrors.

== New General Catalogue ==
Dr. Common discovered 34 deepsky objects which became known as items in J. L. E. Dreyer's New General Catalogue: NGC 3143, NGC 3280, NGC 3322, NGC 3360, NGC 3361, NGC 3388, NGC 3402, NGC 3404, NGC 3421, NGC 3422, NGC 3429, NGC 3452, NGC 3480, NGC 3490, NGC 3663, NGC 3688, NGC 3722, NGC 3723, NGC 3724, NGC 3763, NGC 3775, NGC 3779, NGC 3865, NGC 3866, NGC 3905, NGC 7528, NGC 7594, NGC 7595, NGC 7601, NGC 7610, NGC 7616, NGC 7630, NGC 7638, NGC 7639.

== Selected honours and awards ==
- Gold Medal of the Royal Astronomical Society (1884)
- Fellow of the Royal Society (1885)
- President of the Royal Astronomical Society (1895–1896)

== See also ==
- Henry Draper
