= Crossley telescope =

Reflecting telescope located at Lick Observatory in California

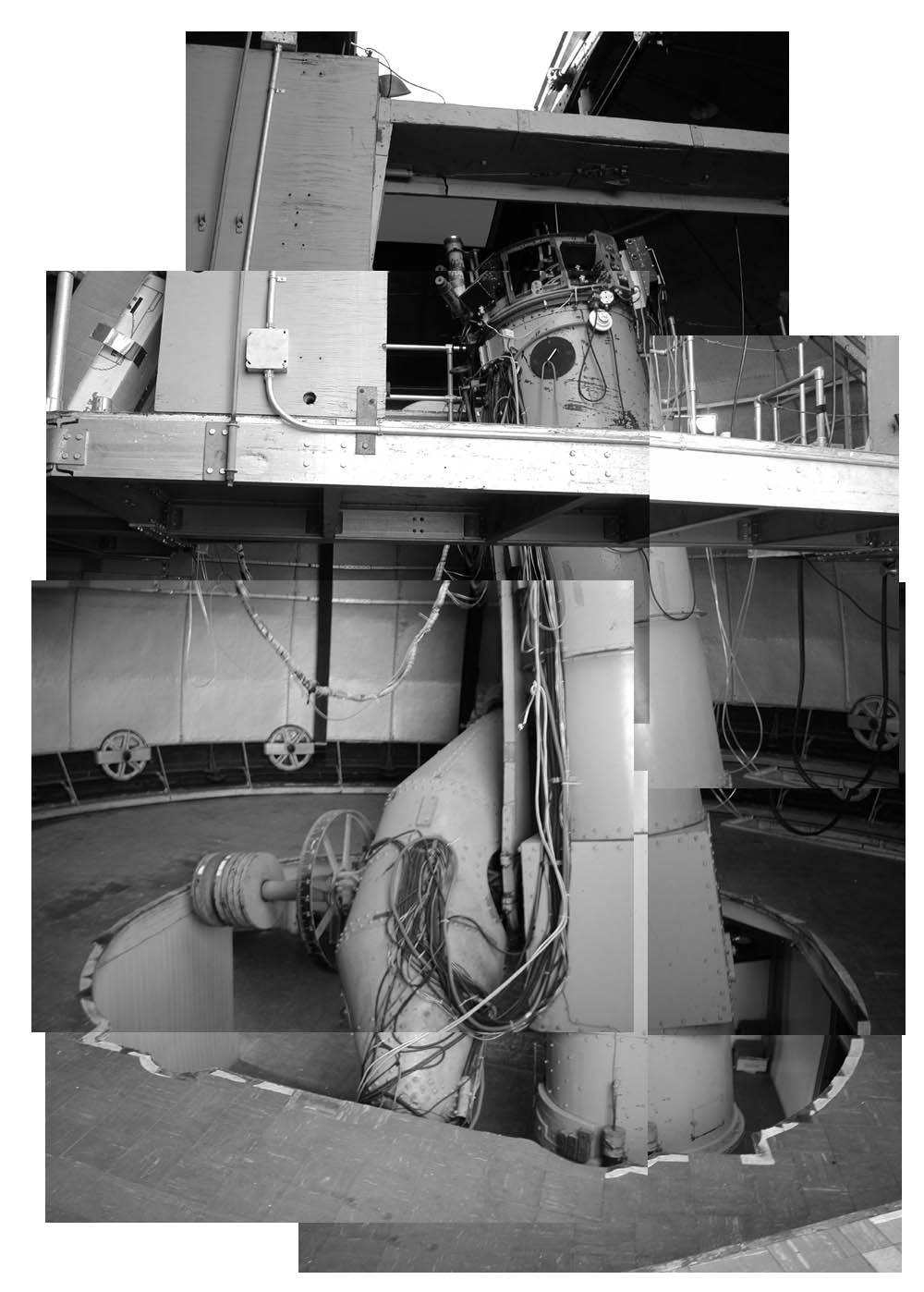
- Mosaic image of the Crossley telescope.
- Alternative names: Crossley Reflector
- Location(s): Santa Clara County, California, Pacific States Region
- Coordinates: 37°20′18″N 121°38′39″W
- Discovered: Mayall's Object
- Diameter: 36 in (0.91 m)
- Website: www.ucolick.org/public/telescopes/crossley.html
- Location of Crossley telescope
- Related media on Commons

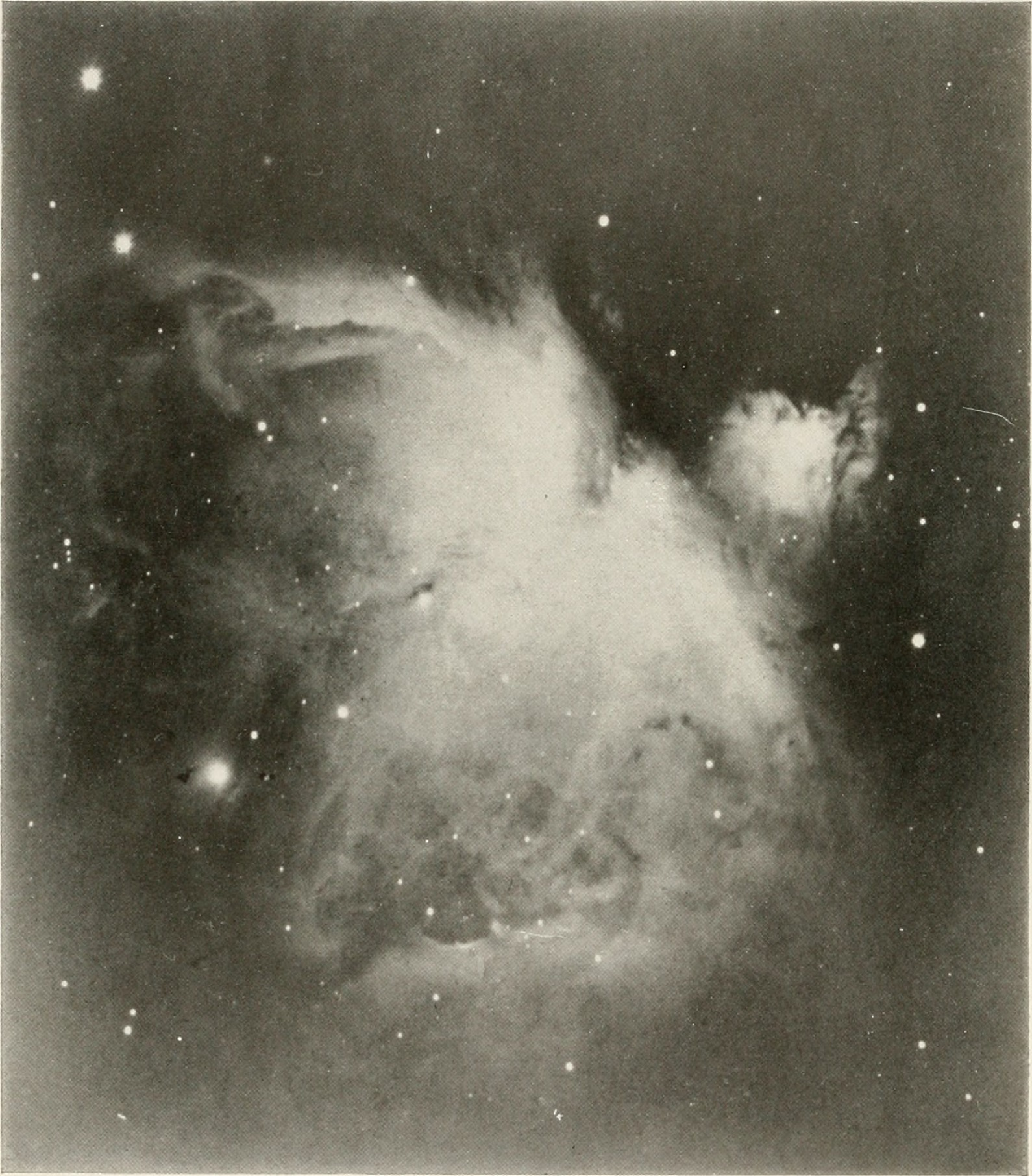
The Orion Nebula, photographed with Crossley telescope by Keeler

The Crossley telescope is a 36-inch (910 mm) reflecting telescope located at Lick Observatory in the U.S. state of California. It was used between 1895 and 2010, and was donated to the observatory by Edward Crossley, its namesake.

It was the largest glass reflecting telescope in the United States for several years after its recommissioning in California. Lick Director, James Edward Keeler, remarked of the Crossley in 1900, "... by far the most effective instrument in the Observatory for certain class of astronomical work."

== History ==
Given to the Lick Observatory in 1895 by British politician Edward Crossley, it was rebuilt from the ground up as it was on a very flimsy mounting. It was last used in 2010 in the search for extra-solar planets but has been taken out of service due to budget cuts. The mirror, and some of the initial mounts, came from the 36-inch reflector originally mounted in Andrew Ainslie Common's backyard Ealing observatory. He had used it from 1879 to 1886 to prove the concept of long exposure astrophotography (recording objects too faint to be seen by the naked eye for the first time). Common sold it to Crossley who had it until 1895.

The 36-inch A.A.Common mirror was made by George Calver for Common, and was ordered after Common wanted one bigger than the 18-inch reflecting telescope, which also had a mirror from Calver. Common completed this telescope by 1879, and went on to make a 60-inch telescope; he sold the 36-inch to Crossley. Crossley set the telescope up in Halifax, England in a new dome.

Meanwhile, at the Lick Observatory in California, Edward S. Holden, the first director, learned that Crossley wanted to sell the well-regarded Common 36-inch telescope. Holden and Crossley exchanged letters and worked out transferring the telescope. Crossley was very impressed by the enhanced observing conditions at Mount Hamilton, and, in April 1895, he formally telegraphed the Lick that he would donate the telescope.

Funds had to be raised to ship the telescope to California, which included money from various donors including many small donations from members of the public, as well as donated services. For example, the heavy parts of the telescope were shipped by The Southern Pacific Company at no cost, a service of over US$1,000 (at that time). Converting the buying power of 1896 dollars to 2017 dollars, that can be estimated at US$12,000.

The reflecting telescope type was scarcely used in the United States at the time of the donation, with a noted exception being the work of H. Draper's reflector.

Observations by Keeler helped establish large reflecting telescopes with metal-coated glass mirrors as astronomically useful, as opposed to earlier cast speculum metal mirrors. Great refractors were still in vogue, but the Crossley reflector foreshadowed the success of large reflectors in the 1900s. Other large reflectors followed, such as the Harvard 60-inch Reflector (152 cm), also with a mirror by A.A. Common, or the 1 Meter Spiegelteleskop (39.4 inch reflector) of the Hamburg Observatory. At this time the 72-inch Leviathan of Parsonstown was the largest by aperture, but it used a metal mirror. Despite the accomplishments of reflectors under Herschel, in the 19th century much of the astronomical community used relatively small refractors, often just a few inches in aperture, save for a few larger ones.

In 1898 Keeler became director of the Lick Observatory, succeeding Edward S. Holden. Keeler used the Crossley, which had challenged earlier astronomers due to its unstable mounting and unsuitable locations, to take a series of photographs of spiral nebulae which were later identified as other galaxies. He observed that these spiral nebulae outnumbered all the other hazy objects detectable at that time via telescope. The detail and resolution of his photographs were remarkable at the time and are still.

After Keeler died unexpectedly in 1900, William W. Campbell, now Lick Observatory's astronomer-in-charge, assigned Assistant Astronomer Charles Dillon Perrine "to take charge of all duties in connection with the Crossley" including completing Keeler's photography of nebulae and clusters including publishing Keeler's nebulae photographs. Perrine completed Keeler's observation of the near-Earth asteroid 433 Eros, for the determination of the solar parallax. Perrine further significantly reconstructed the telescope from 1902 to 1905. Perrine would use the rebuilt Crossley to great effect in discovering eight comets and the sixth and seventh satellites (moons) of Jupiter. The Crossley was so effective that when Perrine became the director of the Argentine National Observatory in Cordoba in 1909, he established a program to install a 60-inch (76-centimeter) reflecting telescope in Argentina. At that time it would have been equal to the largest reflector on Earth. After a world war and national economic crisis the "Perrine telescope" at the Bosque Alegre astrophysical station (Estación Astrofísica de Bosque Alegre) was inaugurated in 1942 when it was the largest reflector in South America.

In the 1930s, the Crossley mirror was tested with vapor-deposited aluminum for reflection, rather than coated by using a silver metal precipitated out of a solution. The telescope was aluminized in 1934, 1938, 1946, and 1951.

Nicholas Mayall was a long time user of the Crossley and added a slitless spectrograph to extend its usefulness in the face of larger telescopes.

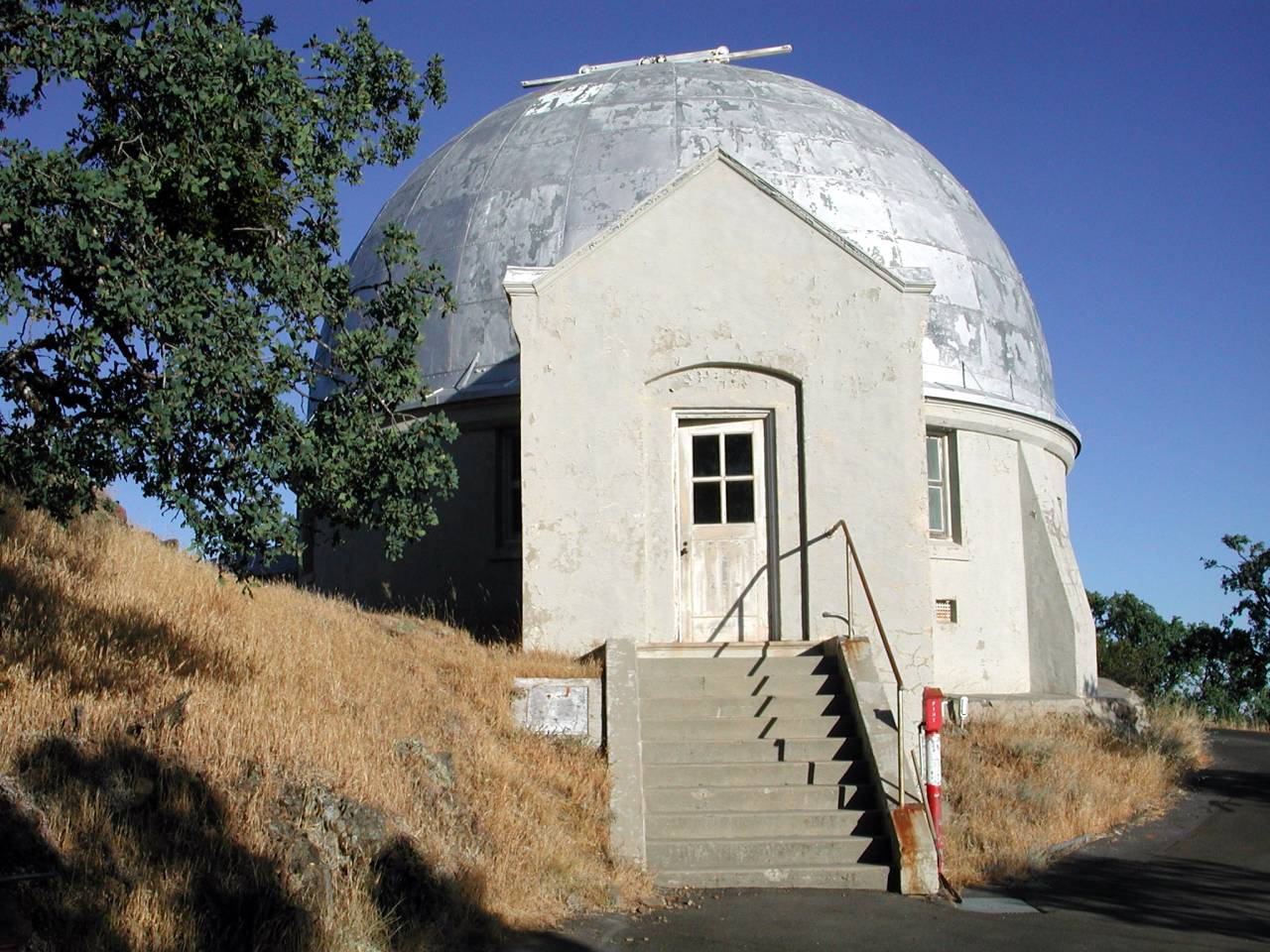

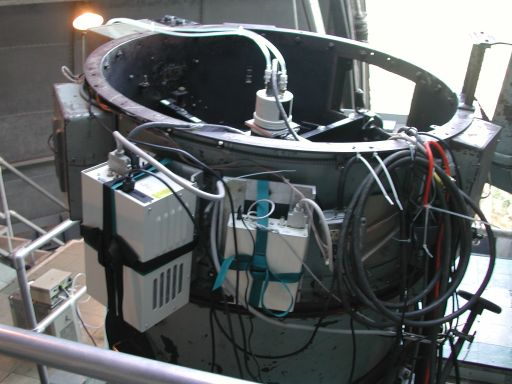

== Discoveries and observations ==
NGC 185 was first photographed between 1898 and 1900 by James Edward Keeler with the Crossley reflector.

Other early photographic imaging targets, dating to 1899, include GC 4628 and GC 4964, GC 4373, and the "Ring nebula in Lyra." Keeler notes that in a 4-hour exposure, 16 new nebulae were found, seeing objects that were normally much to hard to make out with the reflector visually.

As an example of its performance, Keeler noted that in a two-hour exposure of the "cluster in Hercules" made on July 13, 1899, he could count 5400 stars on the photograph. He noted how with long exposure on this telescope the "swarms of minute stars" that gave it a nebulous look were resolved.

In 1900, Assistant Astronomer Charles Dillon Perrine took hundreds of photographs of the near-Earth asteroid 433 Eros for the determination of the solar parallax.

From 1902 to 1905, after significant reconstruction by Perrine, he discovered eight comets and the sixth and seventh satellites (moons) of Jupiter.

Mayall's Object was discovered by American astronomer Nicholas U. Mayall of the Lick Observatory on 13 March 1940, using the Crossley reflector.

In 1990, the Crossley was used to test the photometric detection of exoplanets, including around the star CM Draconis.

Comets known to have been photographed using the Crossley include:

- 1931 I (1931d) was found on plates taken in January 1931.
- 1941 IV (1941c) was observed visually and photographed in July 1941, after the comet re-emerged from around the Sun.
- 1946 III (1946b) was observed visually in July 1946.
- 1946 IV (1946e) was recorded on plates taken in June and July 1946.

In 1978, the Crossley was used to observe planetary nebulae with photoelectric photometry (spectrophotometry).

== Contemporaries on debut ==
Legend
- Reflector (Metal mirror) or unknown
- Glass Reflector (Silver on glass mirror)
- Refractor (Lens)

(100 cm equals 1 meter)

Name/Observatory	Aperture cm (in)	Type	Location	Extant*
Leviathan of Parsonstown	183 cm (72″)	reflector – metal	Birr Castle; Ireland	1845–1908*
National Observatory, Paris	120 cm (48″)	reflector – glass	Paris, France	1875–1943
Yerkes Observatory	102 cm (40″)	achromat	Williams Bay, Wisconsin, USA	1897
Meudon Observatory 1m	100 cm (39.4″)	reflector-glass	Meudon Observatory/ Paris Observatory	1891
James Lick telescope, Lick Observatory	91 cm (36″)	achromat	Mount Hamilton, California, USA	1888
Crossley Reflector; Lick Observatory	91.4 cm(36″)	reflector – glass	Mount Hamilton, California, USA	1896
A.A. Common Reflector	91.4 cm(36″)	reflector – glass	Great Britain	1880–1896
Rosse 36-inch Telescope	91.4 cm(36″)	reflector – metal	Birr Castle; Ireland	1826
Grande Lunette, Paris Observatory	83 cm + 62 cm (32.67" + 24.40")	achromat x2	Meudon, France	1891

*Note the Leviathan of Parsonstown was not used after 1890

== See also ==
- List of largest optical telescopes in the 19th century
- List of largest optical telescopes in the 20th century
- List of largest optical reflecting telescopes
