= Nicholas U. Mayall =

American astronomer

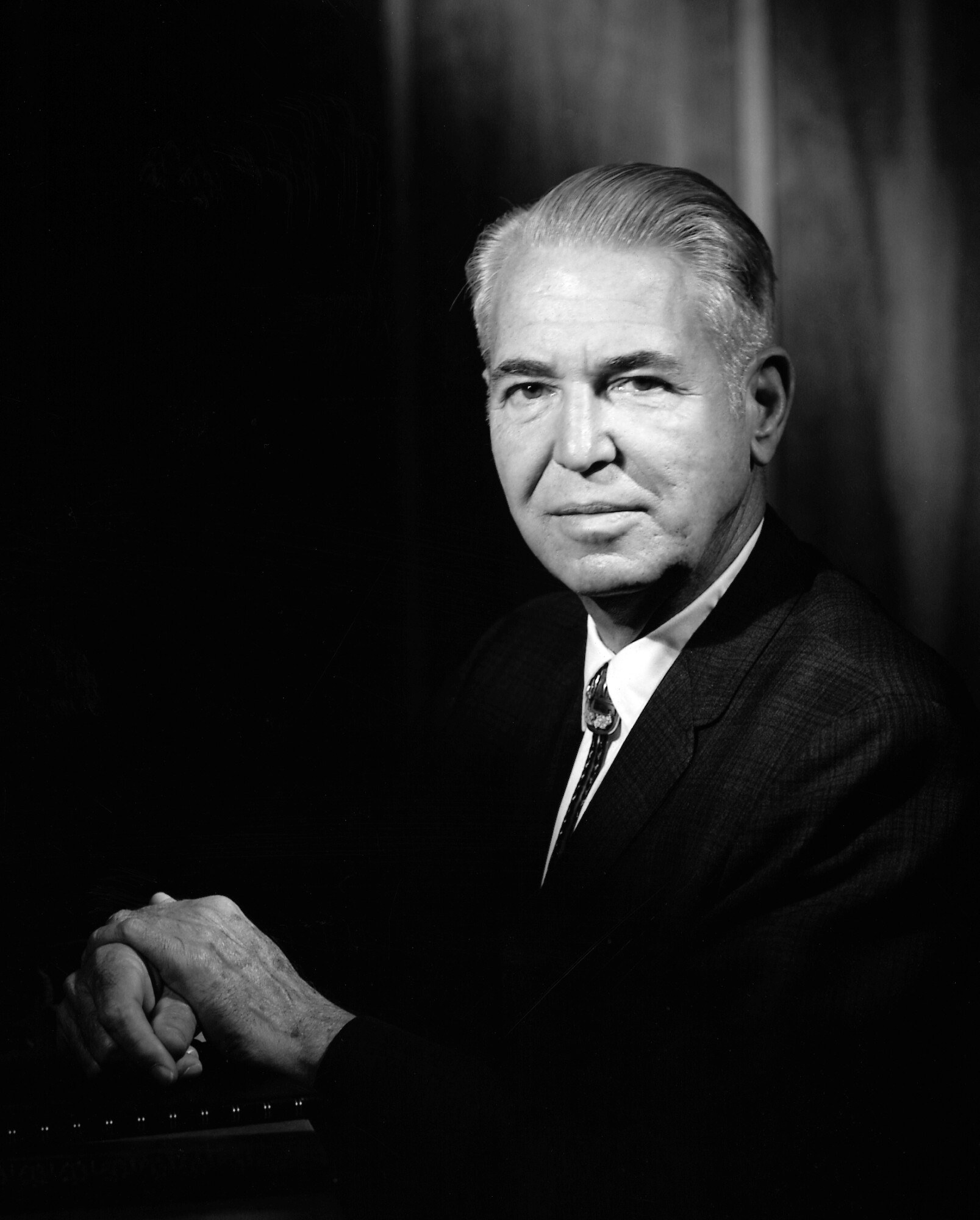
- Born: May 9, 1906; Moline, Illinois, U.S.
- Died: January 5, 1993 (aged 86); Tucson, Arizona
- Education: University of California, Berkeley
- Scientific career
- Fields: Astronomy
- Workplaces: Mount Wilson Observatory; Lick Observatory; Kitt Peak National Observatory; Cerro Tololo Inter-American Observatory

Nicholas Ulrich Mayall (May 9, 1906 – January 5, 1993) was an American observational astronomer. After obtaining his doctorate from the University of California, Berkeley, Mayall worked at the Lick Observatory, where he remained from 1934 to 1960, except for a brief period at MIT's Radiation Laboratory during World War II.

During his time at Lick, Mayall contributed to astronomical knowledge of nebulae, supernovae, spiral galaxy internal motions, the redshifts of galaxies, and the origin, age, and size of the Universe. He played a significant role in the planning and construction of Lick's 120-inch (3.0 m) reflector, which represented a major improvement over its earlier 36-inch (0.91 m) telescope.

From 1960, Mayall spent 11 years as director of the Kitt Peak National Observatory until his retirement in 1971. Under his leadership KPNO, and the Cerro Tololo Inter-American Observatory, developed into two of the world's top research observatories, equipped with premier telescopes. Mayall was responsible for the construction of the 4-meter (160 in) Kitt Peak reflector, which was named after him. When Mayall died in 1993, his ashes were spread high on an empty ridge of Kitt Peak.

== Early life ==
Mayall's father, Edwin L. Mayall Sr., was an engineer for a manufacturing company in Illinois. His mother, Olive Ulrich Mayall, despite never attending college herself, set high educational standards for Mayall and his younger brother (Edwin Jr., born 1907). Sometime between his brother's birth and 1913, the family moved to California's Modesto area, where Mayall entered first grade. Some time before 1917, they moved again, to Stockton where they remained until 1924 and Mayall's graduation from Stockton High School (except for a brief return to Peoria, Illinois during 1918–1919). During this period, presumably during his high school years, Mayall's parents divorced.

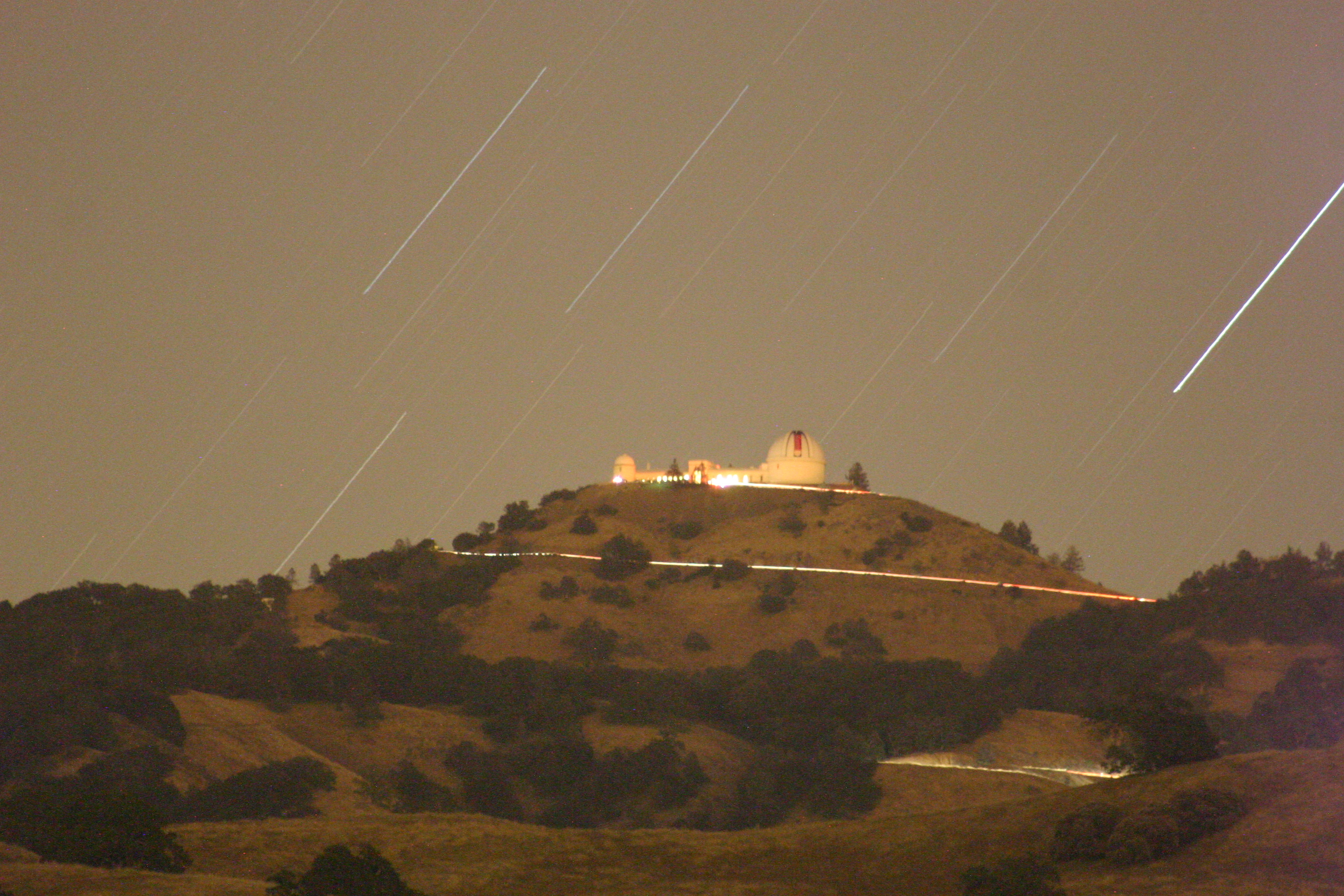
The Lick Observatory at night.

During his senior year, in the fall of 1923, Mayall was secretary of the school science club and set up a club visit to the Lick Observatory. His father permitted him to use his car, a Moline Knight, to transport the club members up the dirt and gravel winding mountain road leading to the observatory. This was Mayall's first visit to the observatory where he would spend much of his career. After visiting, he read all the astronomy books available in the local libraries, although he did not at that time imagine making astronomy his profession.

== Education ==
Mayall began college in the fall of 1924 at the University of California, Berkeley, studying for a degree in mining. He took up residence with his mother in an apartment on Durant Avenue, and worked at the UC Berkeley library to help support them both. Mayall generally did well at university, and was eventually elected to the Sigma Xi and Phi Beta Kappa honor societies. However, at mid-term examinations of his second year, he achieved poor grades in mineralogy and chemistry laboratory. At a meeting with the dean to discuss his grades the latter became aware that Mayall was color blind, which prevented him from observing small color changes in bead and flame tests, and also kept him from seeing small color changes in precipitations and titrations. Mayall's adviser recommended that he change his major, as he would not be able to graduate as a mining engineer with such a handicap.

Mayall's mother encouraged him to study whatever interested him the most, and to do it well, so he considered astronomy as an alternative to mining. After asking many professors in the astronomy department whether they enjoyed their work and whether they made a satisfactory wage, and being content with their answers, he transferred to the College of Letters and Science to major in astronomy. This did not set him back in his degree requirements because almost all of his first year studies had been in basic physical sciences and mathematics. Eventually Mayall discovered that he greatly enjoyed astronomy, and decided upon a course of graduate level study followed by a career as a research scientist.

After graduating in 1928, Mayall decided to remain at Berkeley, as it had the best astronomy graduate program of the day. However, he took a hiatus from pursuing his advanced degree and went to work as a human computer at the Mount Wilson Observatory from 1929 to 1931, where he assisted prominent astronomers including Edwin Hubble, Paul W. Merrill, and Milton L. Humason. This activity resulted in him co-authoring papers on Pluto's mass and orbit with Seth Barnes Nicholson and others, shortly after Pluto's discovery

Mayall returned to Berkeley in 1931 to pursue graduate studies. His thesis topic, suggested by Hubble, was to count the number of galaxies per unit area on the sky as a function of position on direct plates taken with the Crossley reflector at Lick. This should have supplemented the counts Hubble himself was making using the 60-inch (1.5 m) and 100-inch (2.5 m) telescopes at Mount Wilson. Mayall successfully completed his thesis and was awarded his PhD degree in 1934. Hubble complimented Mayall for his work, although significant results were never achieved (nor by Hubble either) due to the lack of accurate magnitude standards for the faint galaxies that were measured and by the (then unrealized) very strong tendency of galaxies to cluster.

While working on his thesis, Mayall had an idea of designing a small, fast slitless spectrograph, optimized for nebulae and galaxies. He believed that if it were used in conjunction with the Crossley reflector it would make that facility competitive for at least some of the work that Humason and Hubble were doing with the larger Mt. Wilson telescopes. It was never expected to compete with the Mount Wilson 100-inch (2.5 m) instrument for stars or elliptical galaxies, which have condensed and relatively bright nuclei. The spectrograph was to be used instead to study extended, low-surface-brightness gaseous nebulae or irregular galaxies. Mayall's thesis advisor, William Hammond Wright, and the then head of the Lick stellar spectroscopy program, Joseph Haines Moore, encouraged him to develop his spectrograph. The device was constructed by the Lick Observatory's own workshop, and proved to be more efficient for extended, low-surface-brightness objects, particularly in the ultraviolet part of the spectrum, thus confirming the expectations of Mayall. With Wright's strong encouragement, Mayall had used fused quartz to make ultraviolet transmitting optics, whereas the Mount Wilson spectrographs used heavy glass lenses and prisms, which absorb ultraviolet radiation.

== Lick Observatory ==
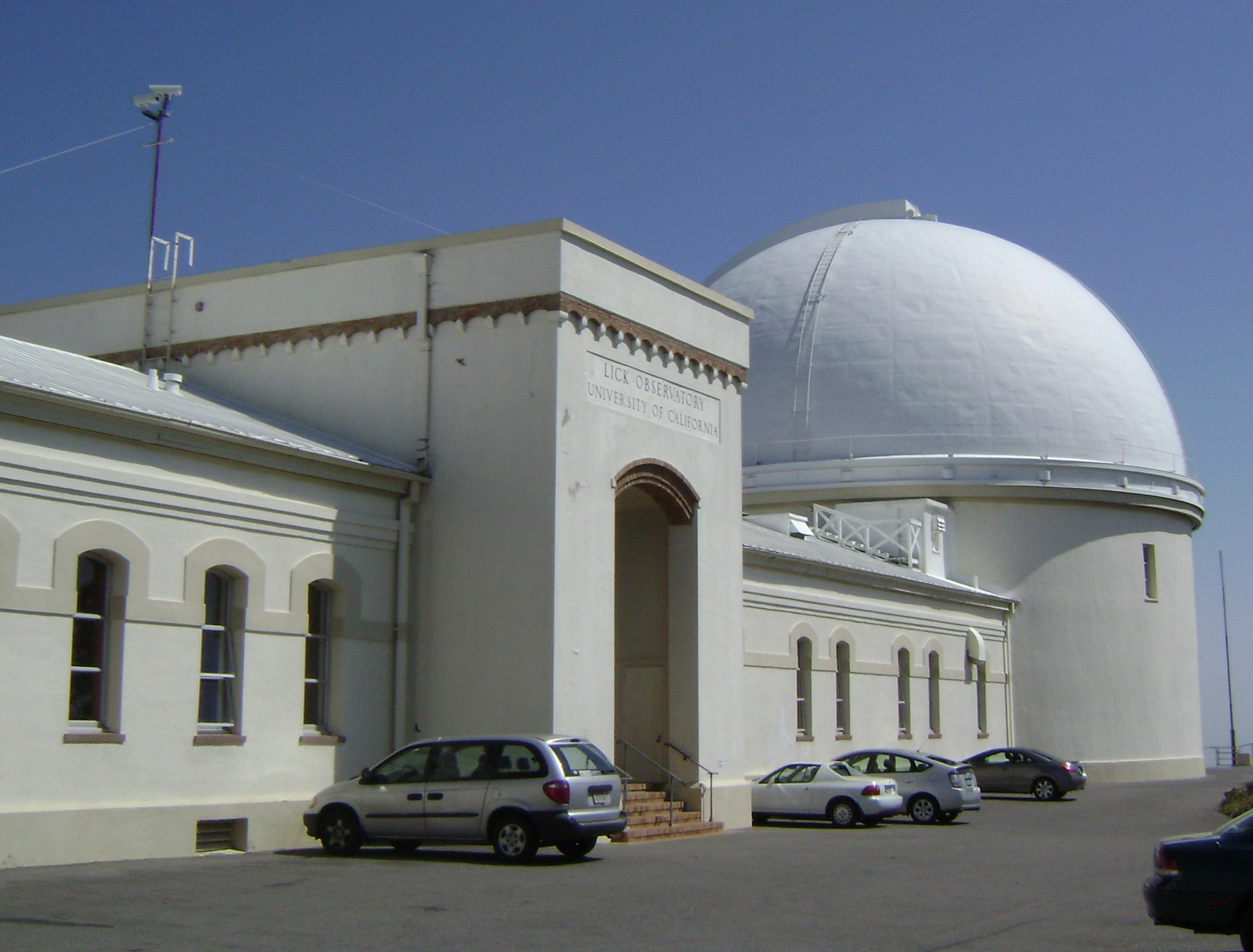
The main Lick Observatory building and the South (large) Dome that houses the south telescope

While Mayall hoped to join the Mount Wilson team upon earning his doctorate, there were no openings during the Great Depression. Instead, he began his career at Lick, which was afforded by the number two janitor resigning and Mayall being given a one-year position as observing assistant with janitorial duties limited to maintaining the darkrooms and keeping instrument rooms clean. The following year, one of the senior astronomers joined the Berkeley department and his salary was split between Mayall and another young astronomer, Arthur Bambridge Wyse.

On June 30, 1934, Mayall married Kathleen (Kay) Boxall from Los Angeles, who he had met during his two years in Pasadena. They lived in a small apartment that was part of the little astronomy village on the Mount Hamilton summit, where all Lick astronomers resided at that time.

Using his newly built spectrograph, Mayall was the first to determine the radial velocities of many knots of gas in the Crab Nebula. Using these data and the previously published angular rate of expansion of the nebula, he was able to estimate its distance. Consequently, he became the first person to recognize and demonstrate that the Crab Nebula was the remnant of a supernova observed and recorded in 1054 (SN 1054), rather than a classical nova. Walter Baade was instrumental in stimulating and counseling Mayall after around 1939, taking on the role previously filled by Hubble.

In 1941, together with Arthur Wyse and Lawrence Aller, Mayall studied the rotation of nearby galaxies and found that there was much matter that was too faint to be observed, but which could be detected by way of its gravitational effect. He spent about three years until 1942 researching 50 Milky Way globular clusters, and found the Milky Way had about one half of the mass previously supposed.

While at the Lick Observatory, Mayall collaborated on a 20-year project with astronomers at Mount Palomar and Mount Wilson on the Big Bang theory of the beginning of the Universe. Together with Milton L. Humason and Allan R. Sandage, he wrote a 1956 paper concluding that the age of the Universe was six billion years (three times the prior estimate, and about half the modern value), and its size three times larger than thought.

== World War II ==
After the United States entered World War II, Mayall accepted a position at the MIT Radiation Laboratory in Cambridge, Massachusetts to work on radar development. He began his work early in 1942 in Cambridge, which was the only time during his adult life that he resided outside California or Arizona. However, the climate of Massachusetts was unlike that of California, which he and his family were accustomed to, and in the middle of 1943 he arranged a transfer to the Pasadena Mount Wilson Observatory offices. Many wartime Office of Scientific Research and Development (OSRD) projects related to optics, aerial gunnery, aerial photography, and bombing tactics were already in progress there. Unhappy with the management of his project and feeling his talents were not being well used, he transferred again in February 1944 to Caltech to work on the development of large rockets. There he became an expert on high-speed photography, which was used to analyze rocket trajectories. In the spring of 1945, he was transferred to a secret atomic bomb project that also required high-speed photography. He visited Los Alamos twice, including once around the time of the Trinity test. By October 1, 1945, the war had ended and Mayall had returned to astronomical research at Lick.

== 120-inch (3.0 m) telescope ==
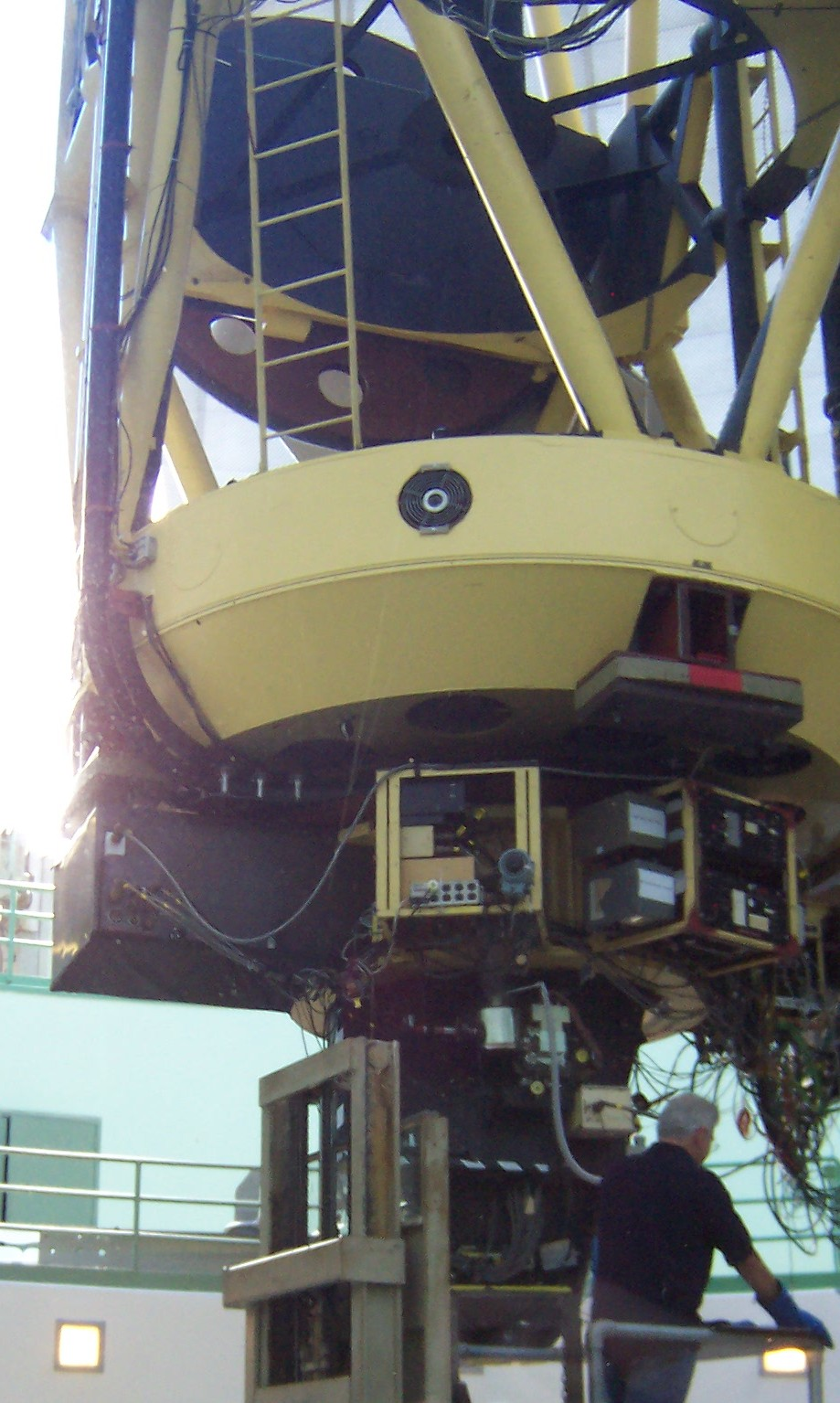
The 120-inch (3.0 m) Lick telescope, with the dome open for maintenance

During World War II Mayall became an important influence on Lick Observatory's future. Ever since 1931, when he had returned to Lick and Berkeley after serving two years as an assistant at Mount Wilson, he had felt strongly that Mount Hamilton required a larger telescope. The astronomers at Lick were proud of their ability to achieve important results with Lick's small 36-inch (0.91 m) Crossley reflector. Its diminutive size first became apparent in 1908, when Mount Wilson's 60-inch (1.5 m) telescope saw first light. This was accentuated by the opening of the 72-inch (1.8 m) Dominion Astrophysical Observatory in 1917, and Mount Wilson's even larger 100-inch (2.5 m) Hooker telescope in 1919. Mayall was adept at working with the small Crossley, but understood that it could never really stand up to a competing telescope that collected nine times the amount of light. This was only going to get worse when the 200-inch (5.1 m) Hale Telescope was completed at Palomar Observatory. Mayall and other young faculty at Lick thought that the older faculty such as Moore and Wright were too committed to the small telescopes and should have tried harder to obtain a larger reflector.

Unknown to Mayall, Lick observatory director William H. Wright and his predecessor, Robert G. Aitken, had both tried in secret to raise money for a larger reflector to replace the 36-inch (0.91 m) Crossley Reflector. They tried both private sources as well as trying to get Robert Gordon Sproul, the University of California President, to provide for one in the budget. Despite multiple attempts, they continued to fail, primarily due to the Great Depression. However, in 1942, Sproul asked Paul W. Merrill from Mount Wilson to succeed Wright, but was turned down. Agitated by the refusal, Sproul changed his stance and told the regents that they had to find a way to raise money for a new telescope once the war ended. At about this time, Sproul promised or secretly appointed C. Donald Shane as director of Lick, to take over when the war ended.

The plan for a large telescope was leaked around September 1944 in the form of the University's budget proposals. Wright and Joseph H. Moore, interim wartime Lick director, imagined an 85-inch (2.2 m) or 90-inch (2.3 m) reflector based upon the funds proposed in the budget by Sproul. Mayall and Gerald E. Kron sent a letter to Sproul representing the younger Lick staff members, in which they requested a meeting to discuss the kind of telescope to be built. They met with Sproul in December 1944 in Sproul's Los Angeles office. Mayall spoke of the key need for a telescope exceeding 90 inches (2.3 m). At the Caltech optical shop in Pasadena he had seen the nearly completed 120-inch (3.0 m) Pyrex glass disc that was initially planned to be used as a flat in the auto-collimation test of the 200-inch (5.1 m) Palomar mirror and urged Sproul to have the Lick telescope use a mirror of that size. Much to their surprise, Sproul agreed.

Shane was appointed chairman of a committee formed by Sproul in the beginning of 1945, to plan the new reflector. Other committee members included Mayall, Moore, Walter S. Adams and Ira S. Bowen. The committee functioned primarily through correspondence. Mayall's first letter helped to convince Shane that 120 inches (3.0 m) was feasible instead of just 90-inch (2.3 m). Mayall helped to bridge the gap between the experienced team of telescope designers in Pasadena and Shane, who was more experienced as a university administrator and professor. Adams and the executive officer of the 200-inch (5.1 m) project, John August Anderson, shared their experience, drawings and plans with the Lick design committee. On March 6, 1945, with both Mayall and Shane present, the committee decided upon the basic parameters of what would become the 120-inch (3.0 m) C. Donald Shane telescope. On March 7, Mayall joined Shane, Wright and Moore (not present at the March 6 meeting), at Mount Hamilton to choose the location upon which to build the reflector.

== Postwar Lick research ==
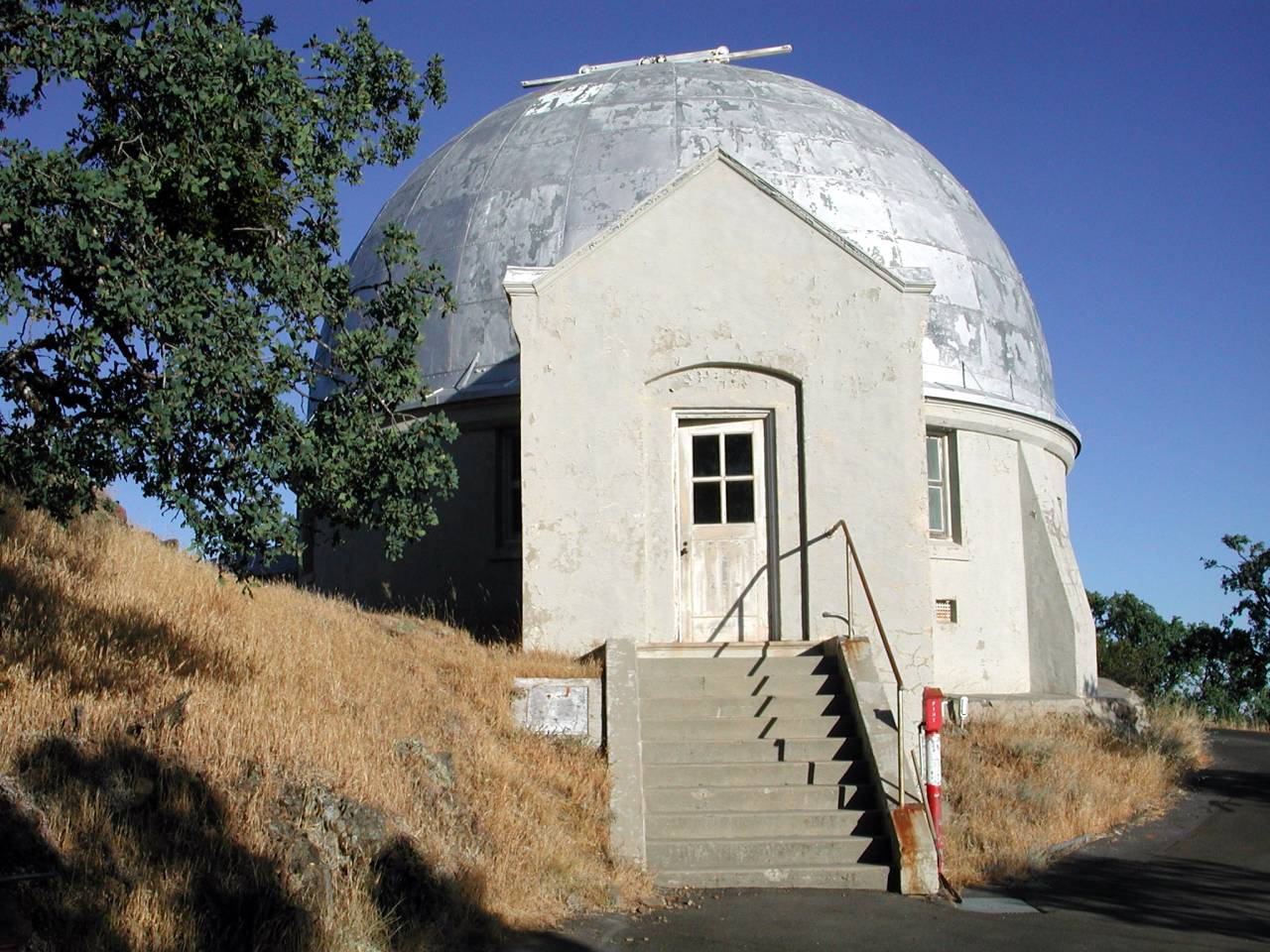
The 36-inch (0.91 m) Crossley Reflector at Lick Observatory

During the long period of building the 120-inch (3.0 m) telescope, Mayall continued to use Lick's 36-inch (0.91 m) Crossley Reflector and focused his efforts on utilizing his slitless spectrograph, which was optimized for extended, low-surface-brightness clusters, galaxies, and nebulae. In 1946, he completed his pre-war effort to get integrated spectra of globular clusters and published the work. His paper was key in demonstrating that the system of Milky Way globular clusters shares only slightly the galactic rotation found in the flattened disc of interstellar matter and young stars in our galaxy. In 1948, Mayall serendipitously discovered a type II supernova while conducting other research.

Other research Mayall performed included the 20 year collaboration (formulated in 1935 by Hubble) with Milton Humason, to gather redshift values for all northern galaxies brighter than +13 visual magnitude. Mayall handled the brighter galaxies on the Crossley, while Humason tackled the fainter ones using the Mount Wilson 100-inch (2.5 m). This work resulted in the 1956 paper he co-authored with Humason and Allan Sandage, on the rate of expansion of the Universe. The paper listed over 800 redshift values (300 determined by Mayall) for galaxies measured from 1935 to 1955 at Lick, Wilson and Palomar.

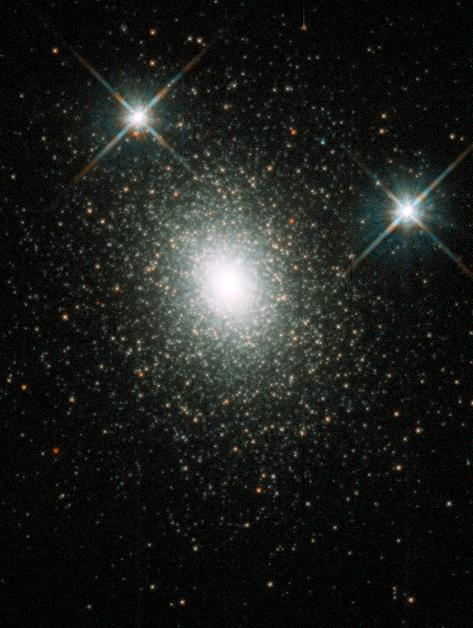
Hubble Space Telescope image of Mayall II, a globular cluster in the Andromeda Galaxy.

At Lick, he also studied galactic dynamics, such as the rotational motion of the Andromeda and Triangulum galaxies. He presented this work at a symposium on the structure of the Milky Way on June 23, 1950, at the University of Michigan in Ann Arbor. This work demonstrated the inner solid-body rotation and the outer Keplerian motion. In 1953, together with O. J. Eggen, Mayall identified six likely globular clusters (including Mayall II) around the Andromeda Galaxy in a Palomar 48-inch schmidt plate exposed in 1948 that was provided to them by Hubble.

Gerry Kron marveled at the sensitivity of Mayall's eyes that could reach down to +17 visual magnitude using the 36-inch (0.91 m) telescope. Mayall's eyesight later deteriorated to the point that he could no longer read.

The new 120-inch (3.0 m) telescope became operational at the beginning of 1960. Mayall immediately began using it, although he left Lick in September of that year.

== Kitt Peak National Observatory ==
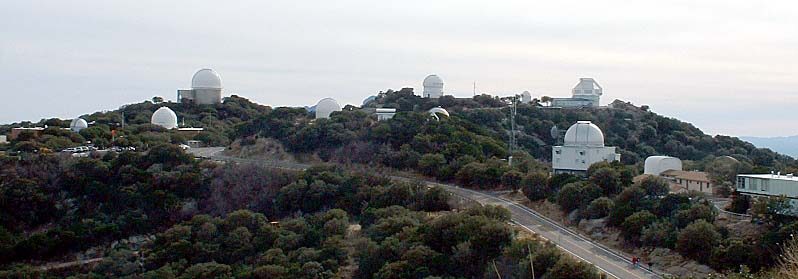
Overview of some of the telescopes at the Kitt Peak National Observatory

Mayall moved on from the University of California (after more than 25 years progressing from student to astronomer), to become the second director of Kitt Peak National Observatory (KPNO). With financial support from the National Science Foundation, several universities had formed a consortium — the Association of Universities for Research in Astronomy (AURA). Its purpose was to create and run a research observatory for American astronomers. The first director was Aden B. Meinel, who chose the site near Tucson at the 7,000-foot (2,100 m) Kitt Peak, and oversaw the building of its first telescope, the 84-inch (2.1 m) reflector which was completed in the spring of 1960.

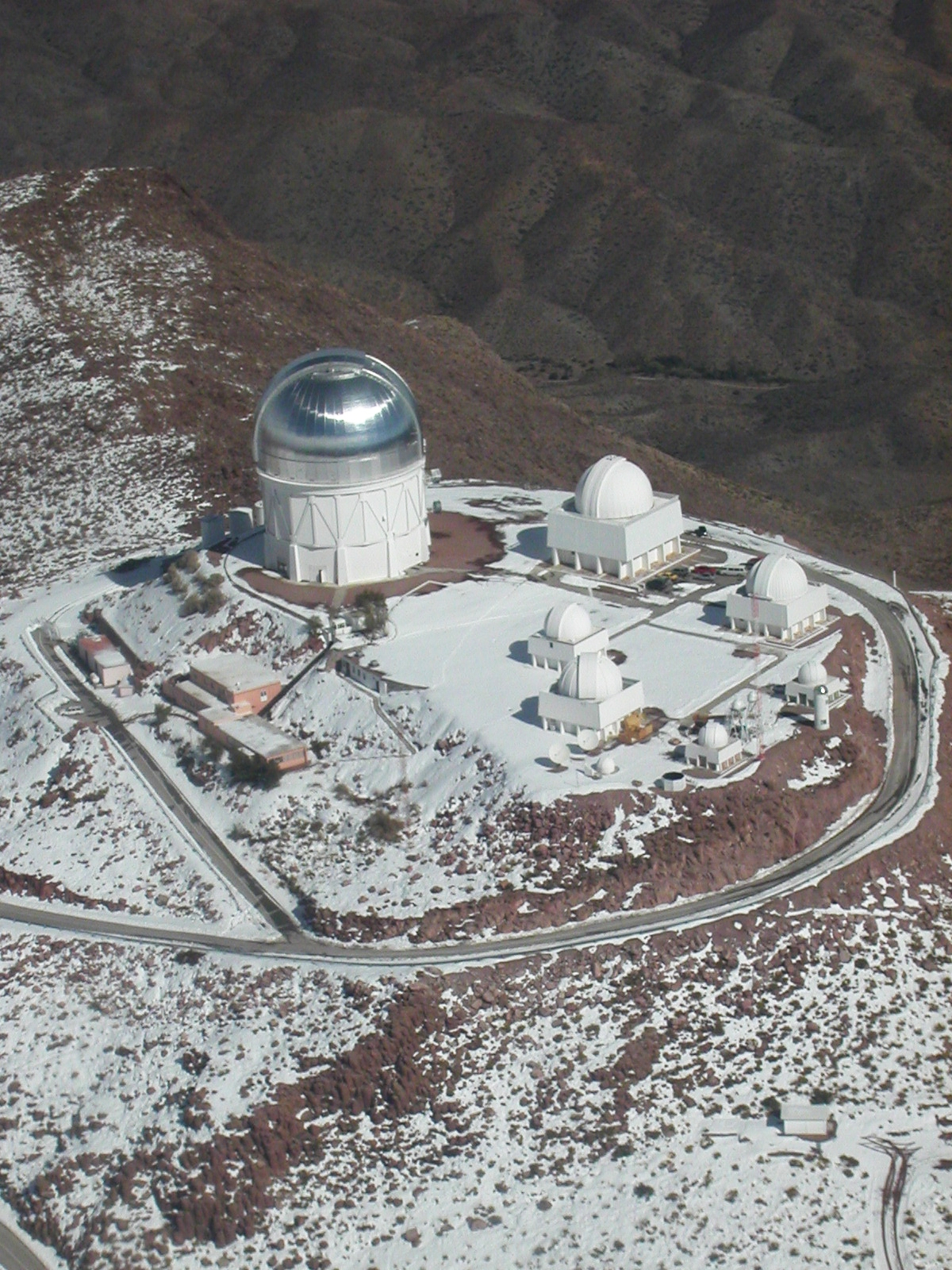
Aerial view of the Cerro Tololo Interamerican Observatory

However, the AURA board decided that Meinel was not well suited for the job and chose Mayall to replace him on October 1, 1960, even though he had no previous administrative experience. Mayall had previously been appointed (in 1958) as a consultant to AURA, due to his experience in planning the Lick 120-inch (3.0 m) telescope. The board's president was Shane, who was representing the University of California, and he helped convince Mayall to accept the offer.

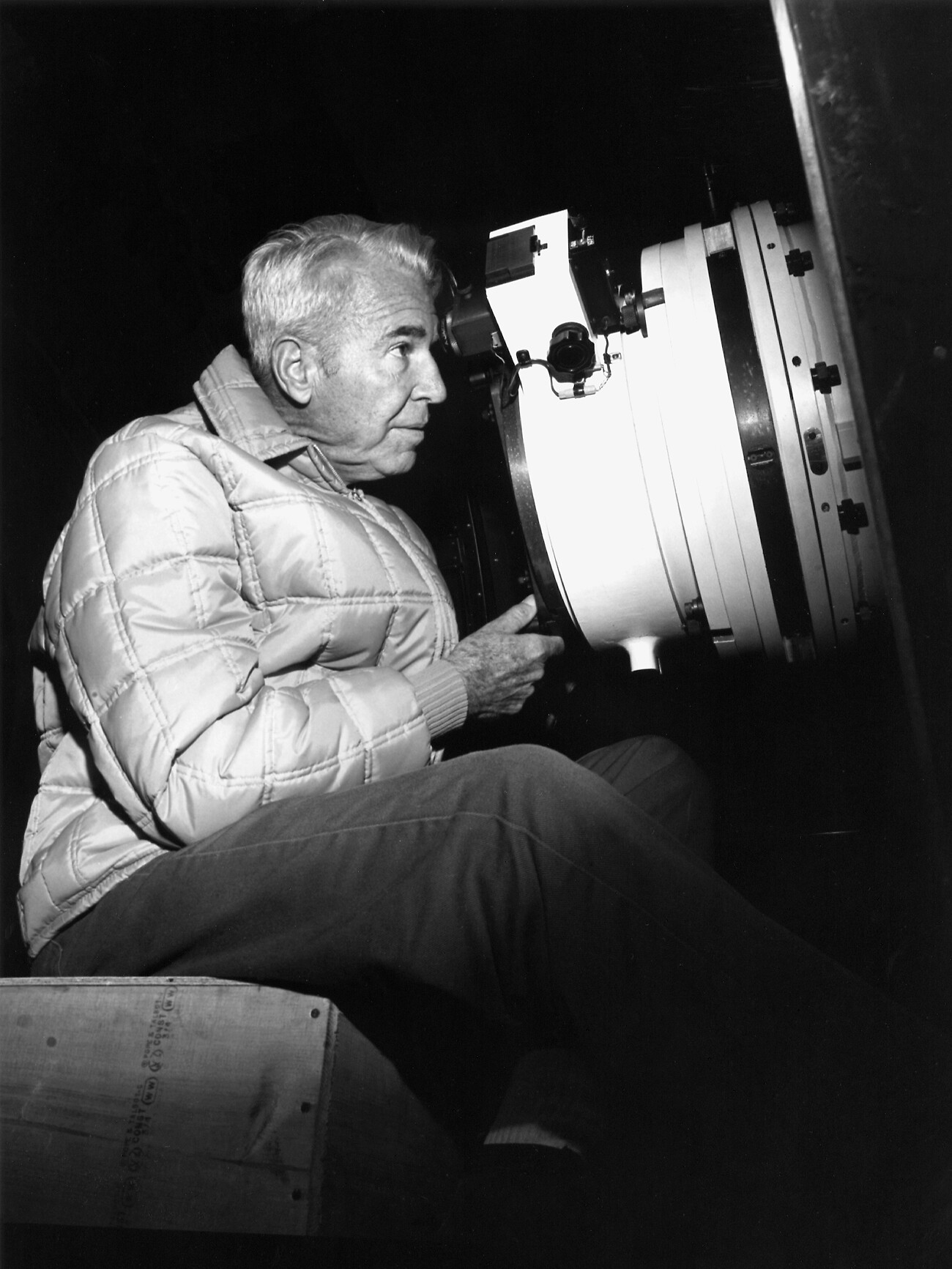
Mayall using the 4-metre KPNO telescope in 1973

As director, Mayall oversaw the building of the 4-meter (160 in) Kitt Peak reflector. It was still being built when he retired in 1971, and was completed in 1973, at which point it was named the Nicholas U. Mayall Telescope in his honor. Mayall was intimately involved in the expansion of the national observatory to the Southern Hemisphere in what eventually became the Cerro Tololo Interamerican Observatory (CTIO). The 4-metre (160 in) Víctor M. Blanco Telescope at CTIO (identical to the Mayall Telescope at Kitt Peak) saw first light in 1974 and was completed in 1976.

== Retirement ==
Mayall retired in 1971, at the age of 65, an event that was honored by a symposium held on his birthday, May 8. During his retirement, he continued to play an active role in many organizations, including the overview committee for Fermilab. He died on January 5, 1993, of complications caused by diabetes; his ashes were spread high on an empty ridge of Kitt Peak. Mayall was survived by his wife of 58 years, Kathleen Boxall, and their two children: Bruce Ian Mayall (1939) and Pamela Ann Mayall, and their two grandchildren.

== Honors ==
- Member of the United States National Academy of Sciences, elected in 1949
- Member of the American Academy of Arts and Sciences from 1961
- Member of the American Philosophical Society from 1962

=== Honor societies ===
- Sigma Xi
- Phi Beta Kappa

=== Named after Mayall ===
- Five globular clusters: Mayall II, Mayall III, Mayall IV, Mayall V, and Mayall VI
- Mayall's Object, a pair of interacting galaxies
- 2131 Mayall, a minor planet
- Nicholas U. Mayall Telescope at Kitt Peak National Observatory

== Publications ==
- Mayall, Nicholas Ulrich; Miles, Howard G.; Whipple, Fred Lawrence (1928), "Elements and ephemeris of comet k 1927 (Skjellerup)", Lick Observatory Bulletin, 13: 120–2, Bibcode:1928LicOB..13..120M, doi:10.5479/ads/bib/1928licob.13.120m
- Nicholson, Seth B.; Mayall, Nicholas U. (December 1930), "The Probable Value of the Mass of Pluto", Publications of the Astronomical Society of the Pacific, 42 (250): 350, Bibcode:1930PASP...42..350N, doi:10.1086/124071
- Nicholson, Seth B.; Mayall, Nicholas U. (January 1931), "Positions, Orbit, and Mass of Pluto", Astrophysical Journal, 73: 1, Bibcode:1931ApJ....73....1N, doi:10.1086/143288
- Mayall, Nicholas U. (1934), "A study of the distribution of extra-galactic nebulae based on plates taken with the Crossley reflector", Lick Observatory Bulletin, 16 (458): 177–98, Bibcode:1934LicOB..16..177M, doi:10.5479/ADS/bib/1934LicOB.16.177M
- Mayall, Nicholas U. (June 1934), "The spectrum of the spiral nebula NGC 4151", Publications of the Astronomical Society of the Pacific, 46 (271): 134–38, Bibcode:1934PASP...46..134M, doi:10.1086/124429, S2CID 119741164
- Mayall, Nicholas U. (December 1935), "An extra-galactic object 3° from the plane of the galaxy", Publications of the Astronomical Society of the Pacific, 47 (280): 317–8, Bibcode:1935PASP...47..317M, doi:10.1086/124631
- Mayall, Nicholas U. (February 1936), "A low dispersion UV glass spectrograph for the Crossley reflector", Publications of the Astronomical Society of the Pacific, 48 (281): 14–8, Bibcode:1936PASP...48...14M, doi:10.1086/124645
- Mayall, Nicholas U. (April 1937), "The spectrum of the Crab nebula in Taurus", Publications of the Astronomical Society of the Pacific, 49 (288): 101–5, Bibcode:1937PASP...49..101M, doi:10.1086/124777, S2CID 121813557
- Mayall, Nicholas U. (1939), "The Crab nebula, a probable supernova", Astronomical Society of the Pacific Leaflets, 3 (119): 145–54, Bibcode:1939ASPL....3..145M
- Mayall, Nicholas U.; Aller, Lawrence Hugh (April 1939), "Emission nebulosities in the spiral nebula Messier 33", Publications of the Astronomical Society of the Pacific, 51 (300): 112–4, Bibcode:1939PASP...51..112M, doi:10.1086/125017
- Mayall, Nicholas U. (1939), "The occurrence of λ 3727 [O II] in the spectra of extragalactic nebulae", Lick Observatory Bulletin, 19 (497): 33–9, Bibcode:1939LicOB..19...33M, doi:10.5479/ads/bib/1939licob.19.33m
- Mayall, Nicholas U.; Aller, Lawrence Hugh (August 1940), "The rotation of the spiral nebula Messier 33", Publications of the Astronomical Society of the Pacific, 52 (308): 278, Bibcode:1940PASP...52..278M, doi:10.1086/125186
- Moore, Joseph Haines; Mayall, Nicholas U.; Chappell, James F. (1940), "Astronomical Photographs Taken at the Lick Observatory", [Mount Hamilton? Calif., 1941], 6, Bibcode:1941aptl.book.....M
- Mayall, Nicholas U.; Wyse, Arthur Bambridge (April 1941), "Increased speed of two Lick Observatory spectrographs treated with non-reflecting films", Publications of the Astronomical Society of the Pacific, 53 (312): 120–2, Bibcode:1941PASP...53..120M, doi:10.1086/125281
- Mayall, Nicholas U. (April 1941), "The radial velocity of IC 10", Publications of the Astronomical Society of the Pacific, 53 (312): 122–24, Bibcode:1941PASP...53..122M, doi:10.1086/125282
- Hubble, Edwin; Mayall, Nicholas U. (May 9, 1941), "Direction of rotation of spiral nebulae", Science, Abstracts of Papers Presented at the Annual Meeting, 93 (2419): 433–443, Bibcode:1941Sci....93..433., doi:10.1126/science.93.2419.433
- Mayall, Nicholas U.; Aller, Lawrence Hugh (1942), "The rotation of the spiral nebula Messier 33", Astrophysical Journal, 95: 5–23, Bibcode:1942ApJ....95....5M, doi:10.1086/144369
- Wyse, Arthur Bambridge; Mayall, Nicholas U. (January 1942), "Distribution of mass in the spiral nebulae Messier 31 and Messier 33", Astrophysical Journal, 95: 24–43, Bibcode:1942ApJ....95...24W, doi:10.1086/144370
- Mayall, Nicholas U.; Oort, Jan Hendrik (April 1942), "Further data bearing on the identification of the Crab nebula with the supernova of 1054 A.D. Part II. The astronomical aspects", Publications of the Astronomical Society of the Pacific, 54 (318): 95–104, Bibcode:1942PASP...54...95M, doi:10.1086/125410
- Mayall, Nicholas U. (September 1946), "The Radial Velocities of Fifty Globular Star Clusters", Astrophysical Journal, 104: 290, Bibcode:1946ApJ...104..290M, doi:10.1086/144856
- Baade, Walter; Mayall, Nicholas U. (August 16–19, 1949), "Distribution and motions of gaseous masses in spirals", Problems of Cosmical Aerodynamics; Proceedings of a Symposium on the Motion of Gaseous Masses of Cosmical Dimensions Held at Paris. UNESCO Meeting Jointly Sponsored by the International Astronomical Union and the International Union of Theoretical and Applied Mechanics (published 1951): 165–84, Bibcode:1951pca..conf..165B
- Mayall, Nicholas U. (1951), "Comparison of rotational motions observed in the spirals M 31 and M 33 and in the Galaxy", Publications of the Observatories of the University Michigan, 10: 19–24, Bibcode:1951POMic..10...19M
- Humason, Milton L.; Mayall, Nicholas U.; Sandage, Allan R. (1956), "Redshifts and magnitudes of extragalactic nebulae", The Astronomical Journal, 61 (3): 97–162, Bibcode:1956AJ.....61...97H, doi:10.1086/107297
- Morgan, William Wilson; Mayall, Nicholas U. (August 1957), "A spectral classification of galaxies", Publications of the Astronomical Society of the Pacific, 69 (409): 291–303, Bibcode:1957PASP...69..291M, doi:10.1086/127075
- Mayall, Nicholas U.; Vasilevskis, Stanislaus (June 1960), "Quantitative tests of the Lick Observatory 120-inch mirror", Astronomical Journal, 65: 304–17, Bibcode:1960AJ.....65..304M, doi:10.1086/108250
- Kron, Gerald E.; Mayall, Nicholas U. (1960), "Photoelectric photometry of galactic and extragalactic star clusters", Astronomical Journal, 65: 581–620, Bibcode:1960AJ.....65..581K, doi:10.1086/108306
- Mayall, Nicholas U. (July 1962), "The story of the Crab nebula", Science, 137 (3524): 91–102, Bibcode:1962Sci...137...91M, doi:10.1126/science.137.3524.91, PMID 17837092
- Mayall, Nicholas U.; de Vaucouleurs, Antoinette (August 1962), "Redshifts of 92 galaxies", Astronomical Journal, 67: 363–69, Bibcode:1962AJ.....67..363M, doi:10.1086/108740
- Mayall, Nicholas U.; Lindblad, Per Olef (October 1970), "Mean rotational velocities of 56 galaxies", Astronomy and Astrophysics, 8: 364–74, Bibcode:1970A&A.....8..364M

== See also ==
- IC 10 – Mayall was first to suggest that it is extragalactic

== Cited sources ==
- Abt, Helmut A. (March 1, 1993), "Nicholas U. Mayall (1906–1993) (1Mar93)", NOAO Newsletter, 33, archived from the original on March 12, 2021
- "Figures Pluto due Nearest us in 1988", The New York Times, Associated Press, p. 17, June 18, 1930, ISSN 0362-4331, "Professor Harlow Shapley, director of the Harvard Astronomical Observatory, today announced that the discovery of photographic plates taken in 1919 of images of the new planet Pluto had enabled him to calculate a final period of 251.8 years for the trans-Neptunian body to complete its orbit. ... Professor Shapley's computations were based on telegrams received yesterday from N. H. Seares, assistant director of the Mount Wilson Observatory, where the plates were made. Mr Seares's telegrams contained data prepared by Seth B. Nicholson and N. U. Mayall of the observatory staff."
- Associated Press (April 29, 1933), "Mount Wilson Films 200 "Hottest Stars"; 100,000,000–Mile Gas Layers About Them", The New York Times, Associated Press, p. 6, ISSN 0362-4331, "A plate exposed by N. U. Mayall showed forty-eight bright-line stars, twenty-seven of which had not previously been discovered."
- "Astronomers Trace Crab Nebula To Mighty Explosion of a Star", The New York Times (New York ed.), Associated Press, p. 15, January 23, 1939, ISSN 0362-4331, "Astronomers of five nations have helped build up evidence that the Crab nebula was once a supernova, a star blown apart by a catastrophic explosion."
- "Astronomy Chief Is Appointed", The New York Times (Late City ed.), Associated Press, p. 16, June 9, 1960, ISSN 0362-4331, "The appointment of Dr. Nicholas U. Mayall as director of the National Science Foundation's new research facility for optical astronomy, near Tucson, Ariz. was announced today. The center is known as the Kitt Peak National Observatory."
- Bouchet, Patrice; Lawrence, Steve; Crotts, Arlin; Heathcote, Steve (March 2000), "A Tip/Tilt System for the Blanco Telescope", NOAO Newsletter (61), archived from the original on July 27, 2011
- Callenders, Harold (February 20, 1942), "Dr. N.U. Mayall at Congress in Mexico Says Galaxy May Weigh Much Less Than Thought—Earth's Significance Diminishes", The New York Times (Late City ed.), p. 12, ISSN 0362-4331, "... Dr. N. U. Mayall of Lick Observatory, who has spent about three years studying fifty globular star clusters in the Milky Way. He said the conclusion indicated by the data from his observations might mean that the whole galaxy weighed about half as much as had been supposed."
- Edmondson, Frank Kelly (1997), AURA and its US national observatories, New York: Cambridge University Press, ISBN 978-0-521-55345-2
- Eglin, Tom (1973), Dr. Nicholas U. Mayall, Cerro Tololo Inter-American Observatory, archived from the original on May 28, 2010
- Federer, Charles A. Jr. (June 24, 1950), "Palomar's Big 'Eye' Maps Far Galaxies", The New York Times (Late City ed.), p. 10, ISSN 0362-4331
- Freeman, Ira Henry (October 28, 1979), "An Astronomical Journey in Arizona", The New York Times (Late City ed.), p. 377, ISSN 0362-4331
- Greenstein, Jesse L. (December 1994), "Nicholas Ulrich Mayall (9 May 1906–5 January 1993)", Proceedings of the American Philosophical Society, 138 (4): 547–51, JSTOR 986853
- Gregory, B.; Abbott, T. (July 22, 2008), The Blanco 4m Telescope, Cerro Tololo Inter-American Observatory, archived from the original on June 15, 2011
- Humason, Milton L.; Mayall, Nicholas U.; Sandage, Allan R. (1956), "Redshifts and magnitudes of extragalactic nebulae", The Astronomical Journal, 61 (3): 97–162, Bibcode:1956AJ.....61...97H, doi:10.1086/107297
- Kaempffert, Waldemar (December 28, 1941), "Review of Gains Made in Science During Year", The New York Times (Late City ed.), p. 39, ISSN 0362-4331, "Drs. N. U. Mayall and A. B. Wyse (Lick) and L. H. Aller (Harvard) studied the spinning of some near nebulae, which are galaxies. It turned out that in many there was much matter so faint that it could be detected only in its gravitational effects."
- Kaempffert, Waldemar (January 19, 1947), "Motion of Stars: Revolving Stars Provide a Check on Earth's Speed", The New York Times (Late City ed.), p. 101, ISSN 0362-4331
- Kaempffert, Waldemar (December 26, 1948), "Science in Review: Research Work in Astronomy and Cancer Lead Year's List of Scientific Developments", The New York Times (Late City ed.), p. 87, ISSN 0362-4331
- Kaempffert, Waldemar (July 1, 1956), "Science in Review: Astronomers Present New Evidence That Universe Is Expanding Like a Bubble", The New York Times (Late City ed.), p. 129, ISSN 0362-4331
- Lambert, Bruce (January 11, 1993), "Nicholas U. Mayall, 86, Leader Of Studies on Nature of Universe", The New York Times, p. B8
- Laurence, William L. (December 28, 1954), "Birth of Universe Traced to Blast", The New York Times (Late City ed.), p. 17, ISSN 0362-4331
- Lindsley, Dave; Edmondson, Frank; Kiani, Shiva (August 25, 2008), Celebrating 50 years; Kitt Peak National Observatory; Milestones at Kitt Peak (PDF), Tucson, AZ: National Optical Astronomy Observatory, archived from the original (PDF) on August 16, 2009
- Ma, J.; de Grijs, R.; Chen, D.; van den Bergh, S.; Fan, Z.; Wu, Z.; Wu, H.; Zhou, X.; et al. (April 2007), "Structural parameters of Mayall II = G1 in M31", Monthly Notices of the Royal Astronomical Society, 376 (4): 1621–1629, arXiv:astro-ph/0702012, Bibcode:2007MNRAS.376.1621M, doi:10.1111/j.1365-2966.2007.11573.x, S2CID 3591548
- Mayall, Nicholas U. (September 1946), "The Radial Velocities of Fifty Globular Star Clusters", Astrophysical Journal, 104: 290, Bibcode:1946ApJ...104..290M, doi:10.1086/144856
- Mayall, Nicholas Ulrich (1970), "Nicholas U. Mayall", in Stone, Irving (ed.), There was light: Autobiography of a university: Berkeley, 1868–1968, Garden City, New York: Doubleday & Company, Inc., pp. 107–19
- McCray, W. Patrick (2004), Giant telescopes: astronomical ambition and the promise of technology, Harvard University Press, ISBN 978-0-674-01147-2
- "Woman Measures Heat of Sun Spots ... Lowell Photo of 1915 Discloses Pluto", The New York Times, p. 10, January 3, 1931, ISSN 0362-4331, "Although a spot on the sun looks dark because it is cooler than the surrounding surface, it is at the inconceivably high temperature of 8,033 degrees Fahrenheit, Miss Charlotte E. Moore of Mount Wilson observatory ... Professors S. B. Nicholson and N. U. Mayall illustrated with lantern slides a paper on "The Orbit and Mass of Pluto," which indicated that the planet has a mass about equal to that of the earth."
- New York Times staff (July 9, 1948), "Star Far Outshining Sun Discovered by Accident", The New York Times (Late City ed.), p. 21, ISSN 0362-4331
- Nicholson, Seth B.; Mayall, Nicholas U. (December 1930), "The Probable Value of the Mass of Pluto", Publications of the Astronomical Society of the Pacific, 42 (250): 350, Bibcode:1930PASP...42..350N, doi:10.1086/124071
- Nicholson, Seth B.; Mayall, Nicholas U. (January 1931), "Positions, Orbit, and Mass of Pluto", Astrophysical Journal, 73: 1, Bibcode:1931ApJ....73....1N, doi:10.1086/143288
- Osterbrock, Donald E. (1996), "Nicholas Ulrich Mayall, May 9, 1906 – January 5, 1993" (PDF), Biographical Memoirs, vol. 69, Washington, D.C.: National Academy Press, pp. 189–213, ISBN 978-0-309-05346-4
- Osterbrock, Donald E.; Baade, Walter (2001), Walter Baade: a life in astrophysics, Princeton University Press, ISBN 978-0-691-04936-6
- Plumb, Robert K. (January 2, 1955), "Science in Review: An Expanding Universe About Six Billion Years Old Pictured by Astronomers", The New York Times (Late City ed.), p. 131, ISSN 0362-4331
- Sullivan, Walter (January 7, 1968), "Science; A Closer Look at the Cosmos", The New York Times (Late City ed.), p. 181, ISSN 0362-4331
- Wilson, Ray N. (2004), Reflecting Telescope Optics: Basic design theory and its historical development, Astronomy and astrophysics library; Volume 1 of Reflecting Telescope Optics, vol. 1 (2nd ed.), Berlin: Springer, ISBN 978-3-540-76581-3
