= Arthur Bambridge Wyse =

- Born: June 25, 1909; Blairstown, Iowa
- Died: June 8, 1942 (aged 32); Atlantic Ocean
- Cause of death: Airship disaster
- Education: Ph.D.
- Alma mater: University of California
- Spouse: Marylyn L. Crandell
- Children: 2
- Parents: Charles M. Wyse (father); Celia J. Bambridge (mother)
- Scientific career
- Fields: Astronomy
- Institutions: Lick Observatory
- Thesis: A Study of the Spectra of Eclipsing Binaries (1934)

Arthur Bambridge Wyse (June 25, 1909 – June 8, 1942) was an American astronomer. He was killed in a U.S. Navy airship accident during World War II.

== Biography ==
Wyse was born in Blairstown, Iowa, the son of Charles M. Wyse and Celia J. Bambridge. His father was a Presbyterian minister. At the age of sixteen, he matriculated to the private liberal arts College of Wooster. While there, he received the John H. Moreland prize for his work in Greek studies, and was elected to the Phi Beta Kappa honor society. At Wooster, Wyse met his future wife, Marylyn Crandell. He graduated in 1929 with an A.B. cum laude, then went work as an accountant for the Bell Telephone Company for a year. Wyse entered graduate school at the University of Michigan, where he decided on astronomy as his profession. He received his A.M. in 1931 with studies in astronomy, physics, and mathematics.

In August 1931, Wyse transferred to the University of California, Berkeley to study astrophysics. He received a Lick Observatory fellowship in 1932 and spent two years at the mountain peak site researching the spectra of eclipsing binary star systems. His Ph.D. was conferred in May 1934, with a doctoral thesis titled, A Study of the Spectra of Eclipsing Binaries. The same year, he was married to Marylyn Crandell, and the couple would have two sons, Kenneth and Gordon. Wyse was awarded a Martin Kellogg Fellowship for post-graduate studies by University of Rochester.

In 1935, the newly appointed director of Lick Observatory, William Hammond Wright, promoted Wyse and fellow Lick observer assistant Nicholas U. Mayall to the staff as assistant astronomers. The two men were good friends, and they collaborated on several papers regarding radial velocity measurements of H II regions in the nearby M31 and M33 spiral galaxies. Wyse performed spectroscopic studies of novae in 1934–1937, including Nova Herculis 1934 and Nova Aquilae 1918. In 1938, he collaborated with Ira S. Bowen to study the spectra of gaseous nebulae. In addition to observational research, Wyse investigated limb darkening of eclipsing variables.

In 1941, a college dean at the University of Pittsburgh produced a list of candidates to direct the Allegheny Observatory. He sent the list to W. H. Wright, asking for comments. The list included Wyse's name, and Wright placed him at the top. Wyse was offered the position, but he declined after a period of negotiations.

Prior to the US entry into World War II, both Wyse and Mayall had applied for Naval Reserve commissions. In December, 1941 he was granted a leave of absence when the National Defense Research Committee called him up for service. He was assigned to the US Navy Radio and Sound Laboratory in San Diego, California.

On June 8, 1942, Wyse was an OSRD scientist on board the U.S. Navy airship L-2 operating off the coast of Manasquan, New Jersey. They were working in tandem with airship G-1 conducting scientific tests of underwater flares for the detection of German submarines. At 9 pm, the two airships collided and fell into the ocean. With the exception of one Navy officer, all hands were lost. Wyse was the youngest scientist among the crew; he was survived by his wife and two sons. On March 24, 1944, President F. D. Roosevelt signed a bill that provided government compensation to the family of Wyse and the other OSRD scientists lost in the accident.

Prior to his death, everybody who knew Wyse at the Lick Observatory had been expecting that he would one day become the director. Instead, the task passed to Joseph H. Moore, who succeeded Wright in 1942.
