= NGC 185 =

Galaxy in the constellation Cassiopeia

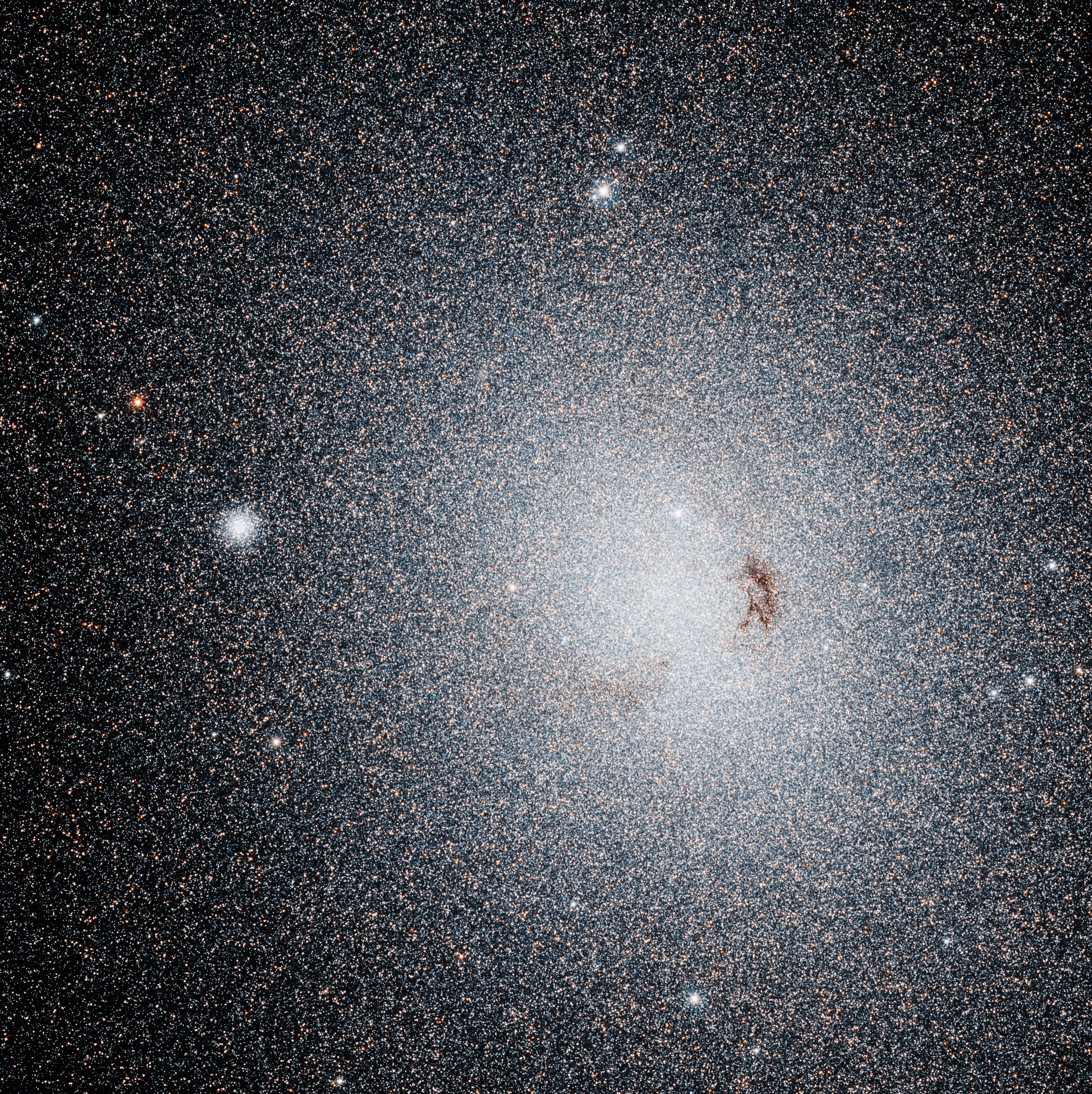
- NGC 185 imaged by the Hubble Space Telescope

Observation data (J2000.0 epoch)
- Constellation: Cassiopeia
- Right ascension: 00^{h} 38^{m} 57.970^{s}
- Declination: +48° 20′ 14.56″
- Redshift: −202 ± 3 km/s
- Distance: 2.05 ± 0.13 Mly (630 ± 40 kpc)^{[a]}
- Apparent magnitude (V): 10.1

Characteristics
- Type: dSph/dE3, Sy2
- Size: 10,600 ly (3.25 kpc) (estimated)
- Apparent size (V): 11.7′ × 10.0′
- Notable features: Satellite galaxy of the Andromeda Galaxy

Other designations
- UGC 396, PGC 2329, LEDA 2329, Caldwell 18

NGC 185 (also known as Caldwell 18) is a dwarf spheroidal galaxy located 2.08 million light-years from Earth, appearing in the constellation Cassiopeia. It is a member of the Local Group, and is a satellite of the Andromeda Galaxy (M31). NGC 185 was discovered by William Herschel on November 30, 1787, and he cataloged it "H II.707". John Herschel observed the object again in 1833 when he cataloged it as "h 35", and then in 1864 when he cataloged it as "GC 90" within his General Catalogue of Nebulae and Clusters. NGC 185 was first photographed between 1898 and 1900 by James Edward Keeler with the Crossley Reflector of Lick Observatory. Unlike most dwarf elliptical galaxies, NGC 185 contains young stellar clusters, and star formation proceeded at a low rate until the recent past. NGC 185 has an active galactic nucleus (AGN) and is usually classified as a Type II Seyfert galaxy, though its status as a Seyfert is questioned. It is possibly the closest Seyfert galaxy to Earth, and is the only known Seyfert in the Local Group.

== Distance measurements ==
At least two techniques have been used to measure distances to NGC 185. The surface brightness fluctuations distance measurement technique estimates distances to galaxies based on the graininess of their appearance. The distance measured to NGC 185 using this technique is 2.08 ± 0.15 Mly (640 ± 50 kpc). However, NGC 185 is close enough that the tip of the red giant branch (TRGB) method may be used to estimate its distance. The estimated distance to NGC 185 using this technique is 2.02 ± 0.2 Mly (620 ± 60 kpc).

== Star formation ==
Martínez-Delgado, Aparicio, & Gallart (1999) looked into the star formation history of NGC 185 and found that the majority of star formation in NGC 185 happened at early times. In the last ~1 Gyr, stars have formed only near the center of this galaxy. Walter Baade discovered young blue objects within this galaxy in 1951, but these have turned out to be star clusters and not individual stars. A supernova remnant near the center was also discovered by Martínez-Delgado et al.

== See also ==
- List of Andromeda's satellite galaxies
