= NGC 3905 =

Galaxy in the constellation Crater

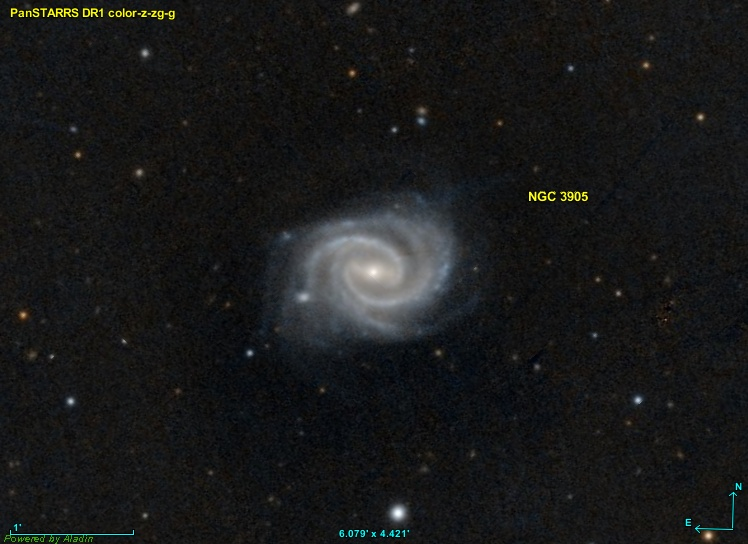
- NGC 3905 imaged by Pan-STARRS

Observation data (J2000 epoch)
- Constellation: Crater
- Right ascension: 11^{h} 49^{m} 04.9143^{s}
- Declination: −09° 43′ 47.784″
- Redshift: 0.019227±0.0000210
- Heliocentric radial velocity: 5,764±6 km/s
- Distance: 238.64 ± 20.80 Mly (73.167 ± 6.376 Mpc)
- Group or cluster: LDC 824 group
- Apparent magnitude (V): 12.9B

Characteristics
- Type: SB(rs)c
- Size: ~155,400 ly (47.64 kpc) (estimated)
- Apparent size (V): 1.9′ × 1.4′

Other designations
- IRAS 11465-0927, MCG -01-30-035, PGC 36909

NGC 3905 is a barred spiral galaxy in the constellation of Crater. Its velocity with respect to the cosmic microwave background is 6,130±26 km/s, which corresponds to a Hubble distance of 294.9 ± 20.7 Mly (90.41 ± 6.34 Mpc). However, six non-redshift measurements give a closer mean distance of 238.64 ± 20.80 Mly (73.167 ± 6.376 Mpc). It was discovered by English astronomer Andrew Ainslie Common in 1880.

NGC 3905 is Seyfert II galaxy, i.e. it has a quasar-like nucleus with very high surface brightnesses whose spectra reveal strong, high-ionisation emission lines, but unlike quasars, the host galaxy is clearly detectable.

== LDC 824 group ==
NGC 3905 is a member of the LDC 824 group of galaxies. This group contains 18 galaxies, including NGC 3702, NGC 3721, NGC 3722, NGC 3723, NGC 3763, NGC 3771, NGC 3791, NGC 3854, NGC 3858, IC 2910, and seven others.

== Supernovae ==
Three supernovae have been observed in NGC 3905:

- SN 2001E (Type Ia, mag. 17.6) was discovered by LOTOSS (Lick Observatory and Tenagra Observatory Supernova Searches) on 5 January 2001.
- SN 2009ds (Type Ia, mag. 16.8) was discovered by Kōichi Itagaki on 28 April 2009.
- SN 2014V (Type II, mag. 18.4) was discovered by Pan-STARRS on 21 February 2014.

== See also ==
- List of NGC objects (3001–4000)
