= 2131 Mayall =

Main-belt asteroid

Discovery
- Discovered by: A. R. Klemola
- Discovery site: Lick Obs.
- Discovery date: 3 September 1975

Designations
- Named after: Nicholas Mayall
- Alternative designations: 1975 RA
- Minor planet category: main-belt · (inner)

Orbital characteristics
- Epoch 4 September 2017 (JD 2458000.5)
- Uncertainty parameter 0
- Observation arc: 41.05 yr (14,994 days)
- Aphelion: 2.0970 AU
- Perihelion: 1.6775 AU
- Semi-major axis: 1.8873 AU
- Eccentricity: 0.1111
- Orbital period (sidereal): 2.59 yr (947 days)
- Mean anomaly: 78.045°
- Mean motion: 0° 22^{m} 48.36^{s} / day
- Inclination: 33.987°
- Longitude of ascending node: 306.05°
- Argument of perihelion: 38.552°

Physical characteristics
- Dimensions: 7.8 km (IRAS:3); 8.252±0.040
- Synodic rotation period: 2.5678 h
- Geometric albedo: 0.2391±0.031 (IRAS:3); 0.244±0.019
- Spectral type: S (Tholen); S (SMASS); S B–V = 0.871; U–B = 0.450
- Absolute magnitude (H): 12.72

2131 Mayall (1975 RA) is an inner main-belt asteroid discovered on September 3, 1975, by Arnold Klemola at the Lick Observatory and named in honor of Nicholas U. Mayall (1906–1993), director of the Kitt Peak National Observatory during 1960–1971, who also worked at Lick for many years. It is about 8 km (~5 miles) in diameter.

Photometric measurements of the asteroid made in 2005 at the Palmer Divide Observatory showed a light curve with a period of 2.572 ± 0.002 hours and a brightness variation of 0.08 ± 0.02 in magnitude.

This led to a follow-up investigation in 2006, when another light curve was recorded. These observations did not indicate a binary asteroid type, but did add to the data set available for this asteroid; this asteroid is part of the Hungaria group.

== See also ==
- Nicholas U. Mayall Telescope (telescope named after the same astronomer)
