= Mayall II =

Group of stars in the constellation Andromeda

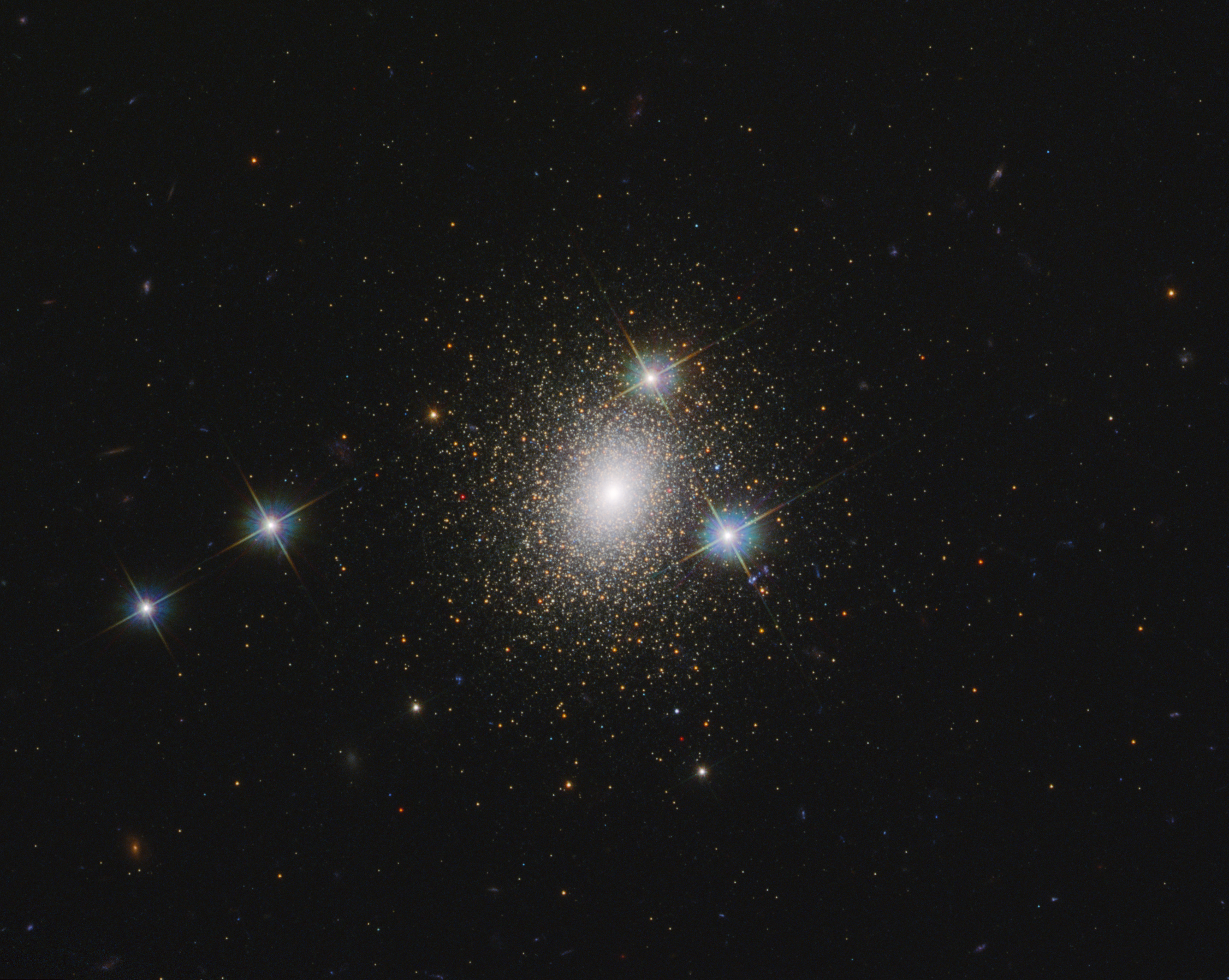
- Hubble Telescope image of Mayall II

Observation data (J2000 epoch)
- Constellation: Andromeda
- Right ascension: 00^{h} 32^{m} 46.51^{s}
- Declination: +39° 34′ 39.7″
- Distance: 2.52 ± 0.14 Mly (770 ± 40 kpc)
- Apparent magnitude (V): +13.81

Physical characteristics
- Mass: 1×10^{7} M_{☉} (2×10^{37} kg)
- Radius: 21.2 ± 1.0 ly (6.5 ± 0.3 pc) (Half light radius r_{h}) and tidal radius 263.2 ± 12.7 ly (80.7 ± 3.9 pc)
- Estimated age: ~ 12 Gyr
- Other designations: SKHB 1, HBK 0-1

Mayall II, also known as NGC-224-G1, SKHB 1, GSC 2788:2139, HBK 0-1, M31GC J003247+393440 or Andromeda's Cluster, is a globular cluster orbiting M31, the Andromeda Galaxy.

It is located 130,000 light-years (40 kpc) from the Andromeda Galaxy's galactic core, and is the brightest (by absolute magnitude) globular cluster in the Local Group, with an absolute visual magnitude of −10.94 and the luminosity of 2 million Suns. It has an apparent magnitude of 13.81 in V band. Mayall II is considered to have twice the mass of Omega Centauri, and may contain a central, intermediate-mass (~ 2×10^{4} M_{☉}) black hole.

It was first identified as a possible globular cluster by American astronomers Nicholas Mayall and Olin J. Eggen in 1953 using a Palomar 48-inch (1.2 m) Schmidt plate exposed in 1948.

Because of the widespread distribution of metallicity, indicating multiple star generations and a large stellar creation period, many contend that it is not a true globular cluster, but is actually the galactic core that remains of a dwarf galaxy consumed by Andromeda.

== Origin of names ==
- Mayall II is named after Nicholas U. Mayall, who, with Olin J. Eggen, discovered it in 1953.
- SKHB 1 is named for Wallace L. W. Sargent, Charles T. Kowal, F. D. A. Hartwick and Sidney van den Bergh. They also named it G1 in 1977.
- HBK 0-1 is named for John Huchra, J. P. Brodie and S. M. Kent in 1991.

== See also ==
- Messier 54
- Omega Centauri
- Mayall's Object
