= Mayall's Object =

Two colliding galaxies in Ursa Major

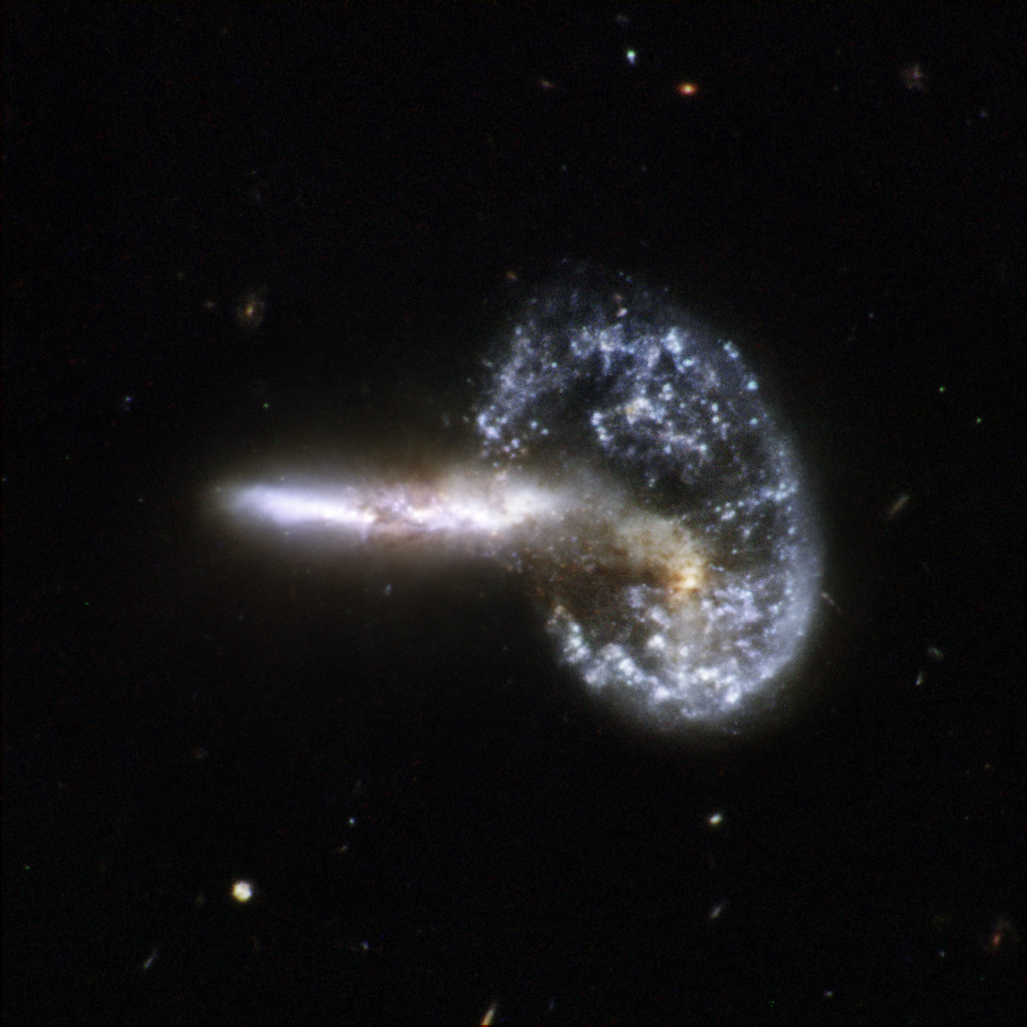
- A Hubble Space Telescope image of Mayall's Object

Observation data (J2000 epoch)
- Constellation: Ursa Major
- Right ascension: 11^{h} 03^{m} 53.892^{s}
- Declination: +40° 50′ 59.89″
- Redshift: 0.034524
- Heliocentric radial velocity: 10171 km/s
- Distance: 450 Mly (140 Mpc)

Other designations
- Arp 148, APG 148, VV 032, MCG +07-23-019

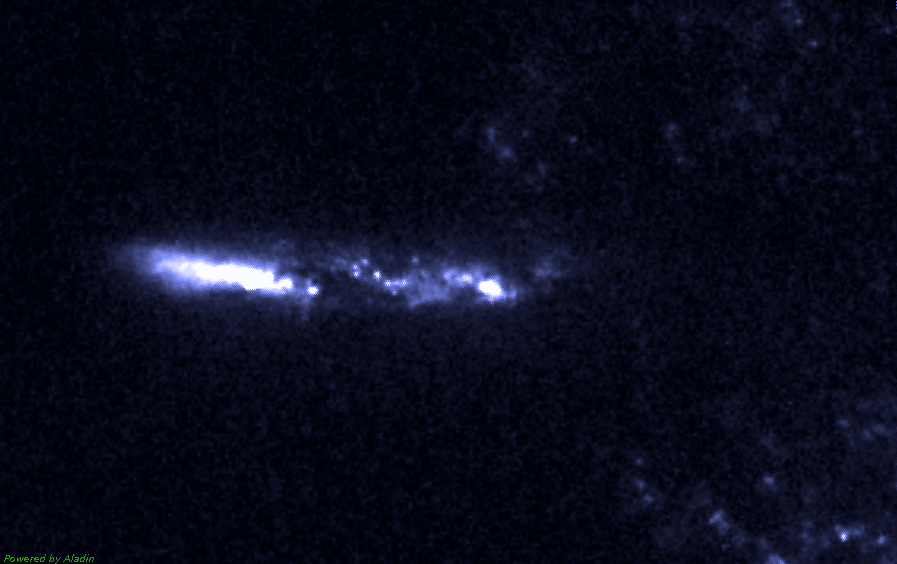
Mayall's object in HST U band color

Mayall's Object (also classified under the Atlas of Peculiar Galaxies as Arp 148) is the result of two colliding galaxies located 500 million light years away within the constellation of Ursa Major. It was discovered by American astronomer Nicholas U. Mayall of the Lick Observatory on 13 March 1940, using the Crossley reflector. When first discovered, Mayall's Object was described as a peculiar nebula, shaped like a question mark. Originally theorized to represent a galaxy reacting with the intergalactic medium, it is now thought to represent the collision of two galaxies, resulting in a new object consisting of a ring-shaped galaxy with a tail emerging from it. It is thought that the collision between the two galaxies created a shockwave that initially drew matter into the center which then formed the ring.

Arp 148 was imaged by the Hubble Space Telescope as part of a survey of what are thought to be colliding galaxies. The image was taken with Wide Field and Planetary Camera 2 instrument. It was released along with 59 other images of this type in 2008 for that space telescope's 18th anniversary.

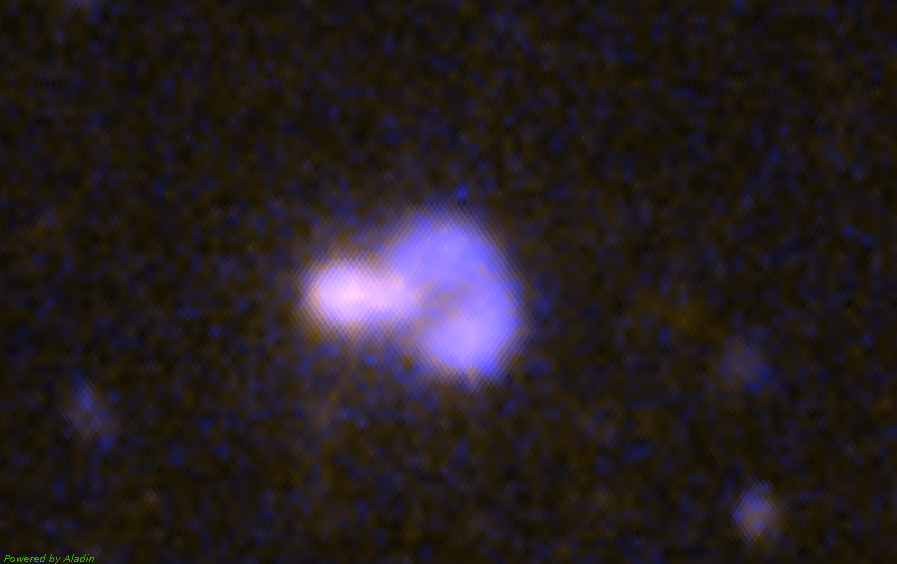
Mayall's object in GALEX color

== See also ==
- Ring galaxy
- Interacting galaxy
- Irregular galaxy
- Peculiar galaxy
- Mayall II
- NGC 2207 and IC 2163
- Cartwheel galaxy
