= Joseph Haines Moore =

American astronomer

- Born: September 7, 1878; Wilmington, Ohio
- Died: March 15, 1949 (aged 70); Oakland, California
- Education: Ph.D. (1903)
- Alma mater: Johns Hopkins University
- Spouse: Fredrica Chase (m. 1907)
- Children: Mary Kathryn; Margaret Elizabeth
- Parents: John Haines Moore (father); Mary Anne Haines (mother)
- Scientific career
- Fields: Astronomy
- Institutions: Lick Observatory
- Thesis: The Fluorescence and Absorption Spectra of Sodium Vapor (1903)
- Doctoral advisor: Robert W. Wood
- Other academic advisors: Simon Newcomb; Henry A. Rowland

Joseph Haines Moore (September 7, 1878 – March 15, 1949) was an American astronomer.

He was born in Wilmington, Ohio, the only child of John Haines Moore and Anne Haines. He attended Wilmington College, receiving an A.B. degree in 1897. Thereafter, he studied astronomy at Johns Hopkins University, and was awarded his Ph.D. in 1903.

After graduation, he joined the staff of the Lick Observatory on Mount Hamilton as an assistant to Dr. William Wallace Campbell. From 1909 to 1913, he was in charge of the observatory's southern station in Chile before returning to the United States. He spent many years performing radial velocity measurements of stars, which culminated in 1928 with the publication of a general catalog. Moore paid particular attention to the spectroscopic studies of binary stars. He acted as the president of the Astronomical Society of the Pacific in 1920 and 1928.

In 1936 he became the assistant director of Lick Observatory, then the director in 1942. He joined five observatory solar eclipse expeditions, and directed two of these. In 1944 he began to suffer health issues because of the observatory's altitude, and so resigned as director in 1948. He taught at Berkeley until his retirement in 1948. Prior to his death, he and Dr. F. J. Neubauer released the Fifth Catalogue of the Orbital Elements of Spectroscopic Binary Stars.

He was married to Fredrica Chase in 1907 and the couple had two daughters. The lunar crater Moore was named after him in 1970.
