= List of largest optical telescopes historically =

World's largest telescopes

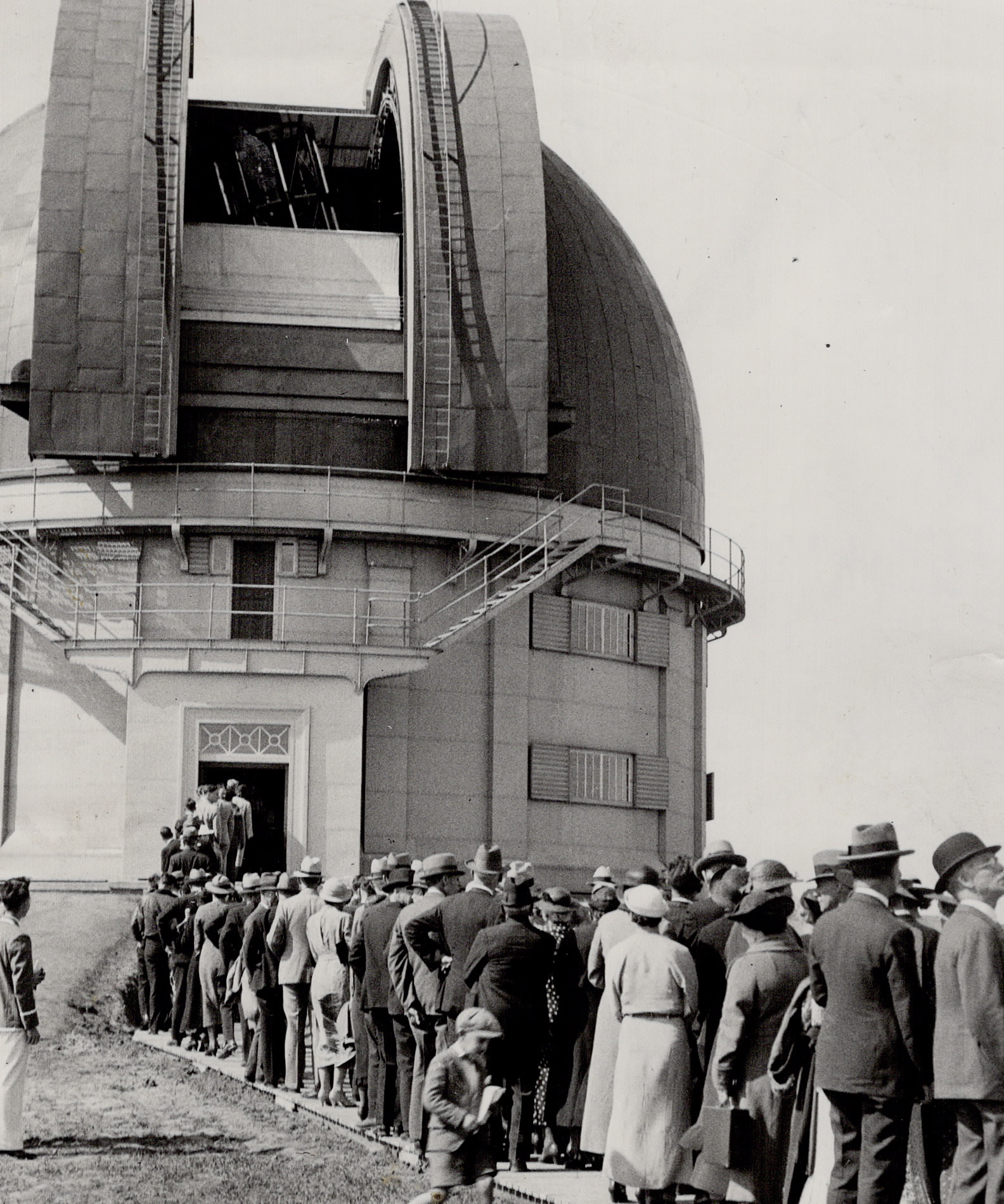
People flock to the new David Dunlap Observatory in the 1930s, the second largest reflecting telescope in the world going by a mirror diameter of 74 inches (about 1.9 meters) at that time.

Telescopes have grown in size since they first appeared around 1608. The following tables list the increase in size over the years. Different technologies can and have been used to build telescopes, which are used to magnify distant views and gather light (especially important in astronomy).

== By overall aperture ==
The following is a list of largest single mount optical telescopes sorted by total objective diameter (aperture), including segmented and multi-mirror configurations. It is a historical list, with the instruments listed in chronological succession by objective size. By itself, the diameter of the primary optics can be a poor measure of a telescope's historical or scientific significance; for example, William Parsons, 3rd Earl of Rosse's 72-inch (1.8 m) reflecting telescope did not perform as well (i.e. gather as much light) as the smaller silvered glass mirror telescopes that succeeded it because of the poor performance of its speculum metal mirror.

Optical Telescopes (List by Overall Aperture)
Name	Aperture		Type	Built by	Location	Year
Name	Meter	Inch	Type	Built by	Location	Year
Gran Telescopio Canarias (GTC)	10.4 m	409"	Reflector – Segmented, 36	Spain (90%), Mexico, USA	ORM, La Palma, Canary Islands, Spain	2009
Keck 1	10 m	394"	Reflector – Segmented, 36	USA	Mauna Kea Observatory, Hawaii, USA	1993
BTA-6	6 m	238"	Reflector	Soviet Union	Zelenchukskaya, Caucasus	1976
Hale Telescope	5.08 m	200"	Reflector	USA	Palomar Observatory, California, USA	1948
Hooker Telescope	2.54 m	100"	Reflector	USA	Mt. Wilson Observatory, California, USA	1917
Leviathan of Parsonstown	1.83 m	72"	Reflector – metal mirror	William Parsons	Birr Castle, Ireland	1845
Herschel's 40-foot telescope	1.26 m	49.5"	Reflector – metal mirror	William Herschel	Observatory House, England	1789–1815
John Michell's Gregorian reflector	75 cm	29.5"	Reflector – Gregorian	John Michell	Yorkshire, Great Britain	1780–1789
Father Noel's Gregorian reflector	60 cm	23.5"	Reflector – Gregorian	Father Noel	Paris, France	1761
James Short's Gregorian reflector	50 cm	19.5"	Reflector – Gregorian	James Short	Great Britain	1750
James Short's Gregorian reflector	38 cm	14"	Reflector – Gregorian	James Short	Great Britain	1734
Christiaan Huygens 210 foot refractor	22 cm	8.5"	Refractor – Aerial telescope	Christiaan Huygens	Netherlands	1686
Christiaan Huygens 170 foot refractor	20 cm	8"	Refractor – Aerial telescope	Christiaan Huygens	Netherlands	1686
Christiaan Huygens 210 foot refractor	19 cm	7.5"	Refractor – Aerial telescope	Christiaan Huygens	Netherlands	1686
Hooke's reflector	18 cm	7"	Reflector	Robert Hooke	Great Britain	16??
Hevelius refractor	12 cm	4.7"	Refractor	Johannes Hevelius	Gdańsk, Poland	1645
Hevelius Scheiner's helioscope	6 cm	2.3"	Refractor	Johannes Hevelius	Gdańsk, Poland	1638
Galileo's 1620 telescope	3.8 cm	1.5"	Refractor	Galileo Galilei	Italy	1620
Galileo's 1612 telescope	2.6 cm	1"	Refractor	Galileo Galilei	Italy	1612
Galileo's 1609 telescope	1.5 cm	0.62"	Refractor	Galileo Galilei	Italy	1609
Hans Lippershey's telescope	? cm	.?"	Refractor	Hans Lippershey	Middelburg, Netherlands	1608

== By historical significance ==
Chronological list of optical telescopes by historical significance, which reflects the overall technological progression and not only the primary mirror's diameter (as shown in table above).

Optical Telescopes (List by Historical Significance)
Name	Aperture		Type	Significance	Location	Year
Name	Meter	Inch	Type	Significance	Location	Year
James Webb Space Telescope	6.5 m	256"	Beryllium mirror reflector – Segmented, 18	Largest space based telescope	Sun–Earth L2 orbit	2021
Gran Telescopio Canarias (GTC)	10.4 m	409"	Reflector – Segmented, 36	World's largest 2009	ORM, La Palma, Canary Islands, Spain	2009
Large Binocular Telescope (LBT)	8.4 m x 2 (22.8 m LBTI)	464.5"	glass mirror reflector – Multi-mirror (2)	World's largest 2008 with Beam Combiner	Mount Graham International Observatory, Arizona, USA	2005
Hobby-Eberly Telescope	9.2 m	362"	Reflector – Segmented, 91	First HET	McDonald Observatory, USA	1997
Keck 1	10 m	394"	Reflector – Segmented, 36	World's largest 1993	Mauna Kea Observatory, Hawaii, USA	1993
Hubble (HST)	2.4 m	94"	glass mirror reflector	Largest Visible-light space based telescope	Low Earth orbit NASA+ ESA	1990
BTA-6	6 m	238"	glass mirror reflector	World's largest 1976	Zelenchukskaya, Russia	1976
McMath-Pierce Solar Telescope	1.61 m	63"	glass mirror reflector	Largest solar telescope	Kitt Peak National Obs., USA	1962
Hale Telescope (200 inch)	5.08 m	200"	glass mirror reflector	World's largest 1948	Palomar Observatory, California, USA	1948
Samuel Oschin telescope	1.22 m	48"	glass mirror reflector – Schmidt camera	World's largest Schmidt camera 1948	Palomar Observatory, California, USA	1948
George Ritchey 40-inch (1 m)	102 cm	40"	glass mirror reflector	First large Ritchey-Chrétien	Flagstaff, Arizona, USA (Washington, D.C. until 1955)	1934
Plaskett telescope	1.83 m	72"	glass mirror reflector	Designed as world's largest but beaten by the 100-inch Hooker telescope	Dominion Astrophysical Observatory, Canada, USA	1918
Hooker Telescope	2.54 m	100"	glass mirror reflector	World's largest 1917	Mt. Wilson Observatory, California, USA	1917
Hale 60-Inch Telescope	1.524 m	60"	glass mirror reflector	The first of the "modern" large research reflectors, designed and located for precision imaging.	Mt. Wilson Observatory, California, USA	1908
Great Paris Exhibition Telescope of 1900	125 cm	49.21"	refractor – achromat	Largest refractor ever built, scrapped after Exhibition.	Exposition Universelle (1900), Paris, France	1900–1901
A. A. Common's 60-inch Ealing reflector	1.524 m	60"	glass mirror reflector	World's largest glass mirror reflector 1889, sold to Harvard 1904, moved to South Africa 1920s (Boyden Observatory) where it was largest telescope in the southern hemisphere.	Ealing, Harvard College Observatory, Cambridge, Massachusetts, USA;Boyden Observatory, South Africa	1889
Yerkes Refractor	102 cm	40"	refractor – achromat	Largest operational refractor	Yerkes Observatory, Wisconsin, USA	1897
A. A. Common's 36 inch Ealing reflector	91.4 cm	36"	glass mirror reflector	First to prove fainter than naked eye astrophotography; sold, became Crossley Reflector	A. A. Common Reflector, Great Britain / Lick Observatory, California, USA	1879
Great Melbourne Telescope	1.22 m	48"	speculum metal mirror reflector	Last large reflector with a speculum metal mirror, world's largest equatorially mounted telescope for several decades.	Melbourne Observatory, Melbourne, Australia	1868–1889
Foucault's telescope	0.8 m	31.5"	glass mirror reflector	First metal coated glass mirror telescope	Marseille Observatory, France	1862
William Lassell 48-inch	1.22 m	48"	speculum metal mirror reflector		Malta	1861–1865
Rosse telescope: Leviathan of Parsonstown	1.83 m	72"	metal – speculum metal mirror reflector	World's largest 1845	Birr Castle, Ireland	1845–1908
William Lassell 24-inch	61 cm	24"	speculum metal mirror reflector		Liverpool, England	1845
Great Dorpat Refractor (Fraunhofer); Dorpat/Tartu Observatory	24 cm	9.6"	refractor – achromat	"...the first modern, achromatic, refracting telescope."	Dorpat, Governorate of Estonia	1824
Rosse 36-inch Telescope	91.4 cm	36"	speculum metal mirror reflector		Birr Castle, Ireland	1826
Herschel's 40-foot (126 cm d.)	1.26 m	49.5"	speculum metal mirror reflector	World's largest 1789	Observatory House, England	1789–1815
Herschel's 20-foot (47.5 cm d.)	47.5 cm	18.5"	speculum metal mirror reflector		Observatory House, England	1782
Reverend John Michell's Gregorian reflector	75 cm	29.5"	speculum metal mirror – Gregorian reflector	World's largest 1780	Yorkshire, Great Britain	1780–1789
Dollond Apochromatic Triplet	9.53 cm	3.75"	Refractor – apochromat	First apochromatic triplet	England	1763
Father Noel's Gregorian reflector	60 cm	23.5"	speculum metal mirror – Gregorian reflector	World's largest 1761	Paris, France	1761
James Short's Gregorian reflector	50 cm	19.5"	speculum metal mirror – Gregorian reflector	World's largest 1750	Great Britain	1750
James Short's Gregorian reflector	38 cm	14"	speculum metal mirror – Gregorian reflector	World's largest 1734	Great Britain	1734
Chester Moore Hall's Doublet	6.4 cm	2.5"	Refractor – achromat	First achromatic doublet	Great Britain	1733
Hadley's Reflector	15 cm	6"	speculum metal mirror reflector	First parabolic newtonian	Great Britain	1721
Christiaan Huygens 210 foot refractor	22 cm	8.5"	Refractor – Aerial telescope	World's largest 1686	Netherlands	1686
Christiaan Huygens 170 foot refractor	20 cm	8"	Refractor – Aerial telescope	World's largest 1689	Netherlands	1686
Christiaan Huygens 210 foot refractor	19 cm	7.5"	Refractor – Aerial telescope	World's largest 1686	Netherlands	1686
Hooke's reflector	18 cm	7"	speculum metal mirror – Gregorian reflector	First Gregorian	Great Britain	1674
Newton's Reflector	3.3 cm	1.3"	speculum metal mirror reflector	First reflecting telescope	England (mobile)	1668
Hevelius refractor	12 cm	4.7"	Refractor	World's largest 1645	Gdańsk (Danzig), Poland	1645
Hevelius Scheiner's helioscope	6 cm	2.3"	Refractor	World's largest 1638 & First Equatorial	Gdańsk (Danzig), Poland	1638
Galileo's 1620 telescope	3.8 cm	1.5"	Refractor	World's largest 1620	Italy	1620
Galileo's 1612 telescope	2.6 cm	1"	Refractor	World's largest 1612	Italy	1612
Galileo's 1609 telescope	1.5 cm	0.62"	Refractor	World's largest 1609	Italy	1609
Hans Lippershey's telescope	? cm	.?"	Refractor	World's first recorded telescope	Netherlands	1608

Legend

Segmented Mirror (Mosaic) Glass Reflector
Glass Reflector (Metal coating on glass mirror)
Reflector (Metal mirror)
Refractor (Lens) or other

== See also ==
- History of the telescope
- Lists of telescopes
- List of optical telescopes
- List of largest optical reflecting telescopes
- List of largest optical refracting telescopes
- List of largest optical telescopes in the 20th century
- List of largest optical telescopes in the 19th century
- List of largest optical telescopes in the 18th century
- List of space telescopes
- List of telescope types
- Microscope (For magnifying very small things)
