= List of largest optical telescopes in the 18th century =

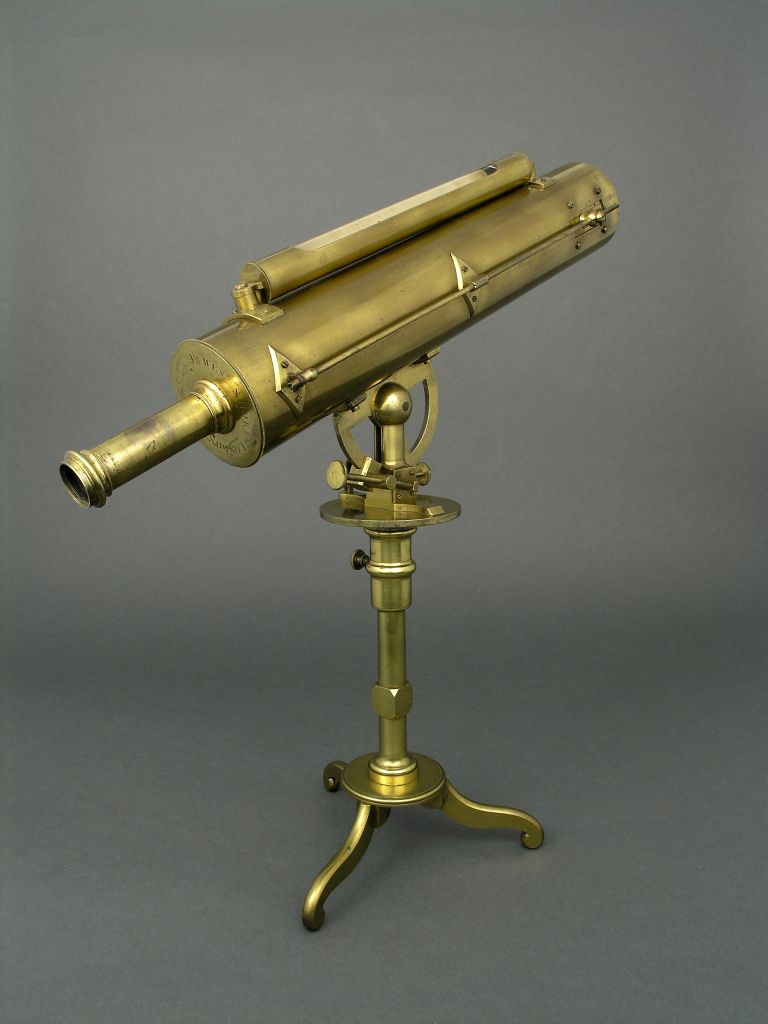
A reflecting telescope by James Short; this English telescope maker produced almost 1400 Gregorian reflectors in the mid-1700s. Mobile versions were used to observe the Transit of Venus.

List of largest optical telescopes in the 18th century includes various refractors and reflectors that were active some time between about 1699 to 1801. It is oriented towards astronomy, not terrestrial telescopes (e.g., spyglasses).

Many of the largest were metal mirror reflectors, some of which had substational apertures even for the 20th century. One problem was that many instrument makers. including William Herschel, did not pass on their mirror-making craft, and by the next century reflectors had largely been passed over in favour of small achromats (2-lens refractors). It was not until the 20th century that really large reflectors would predominate once again.

The major breakthrough in the 18th century was the perfection of two and even three lens refractor telescopes, as well as the increased number of reflectors using polished metal mirrors rather than metal-coated glass, which was not developed until the mid-19th century.

== Selected Reflectors & Refractors ==
The main telescope technologies during this period were refractors with non-achromatic objectives (single lens), speculum metal reflectors, refractors with achromatic doublets objective (doublet lens), and apochromatic triplets (after 1760s) objectives. The list is inherently limited by what examples and records have survived.

Legend
- Reflector (Metal mirror)
- Refractor (Achromatic Doublet or Apochromatic Triplet)
- Refractor (Singlet)

Name(s)	Aperture cm (in)	Type	Significance	Location then/Original Site	Extant*
Herschel 40-foot (1.26 m diameter)	126 cm(49.5")	Reflector	World's largest 1789; Mimas & Enceladus discovery telescope	Observatory House, Slough, England	1789–1815
Reverend John Michell's Gregorian reflector	75 cm (29.5")	Reflector – Gregorian	World's largest 1780	Yorkshire, Great Britain	1780–1789
Herschel "X Feet" or "Large 10 Feet"	61 cm (24")	Reflector		England	1800
Father Noel's Gregorian reflector	60 cm (23.5")	Reflector – Gregorian	World's largest 1761; 1796 Newtonian conversion	Paris, France	1761-1841
James Short Gregorian reflector	50 cm (19.5")	Reflector – Gregorian	World's largest 1750	Scotland	1750
Schröter 27 foot Newtonian	47 cm (18.5")	Reflector		Lilienthal, Lower Saxony (Germany)	1793–1813
Herschel 20-foot	47 cm (18.5")	Reflector		Observatory House; England	1782
James Short Reflector for King of Spain	46 cm (18.1")	Reflector – Gregorian		Spain	1752
James Short's Gregorian reflector	38 cm (14")	Reflector – Gregorian	World's largest 1734	Scotland	1734
Huygens aerial for Royal Society of London	19 cm (7.5")	aerial		London, England	1691–1786
William Herschel 7-foot	16 cm (6.3")	Reflector	Used to discover Georgium Sidus (Uranus)	England	1776–1783
Hadley's Reflector	15 cm (6")	Reflector	First parabolic newtonian	England	1721
Van Deyl of Amsterdam telescope	11.4 cm (4.5")	achromat		England	1781
James Short 4.5 inch reflector	11.4 cm (4.5")	reflector		England	1737
Shuckburgh telescope	10 cm (4.1")	achromat	First large equatorial	Warwickshire, England	1791–1923
Dollond Apochromatic Triplet	9.53 cm (3.75")	apochromat	First apochromatic triplet	England	1763
Dollond Triplet for Wollaston	9.02 cm	triple lens	RAS No. 16	England	1771
Francesco Bianchini's aerial telescope	6.6 cm (2.6")	aerial		Rome, Italy	1726
Chester Moore Hall's Doublet	6.4 cm (2.5")	achromat	First achromatic doublet	England	1733
Troughton Equatorial Telescope	5.08 cm (2")	achromat	Equatorial mount	Armagh Observatory, Ireland	1795
Newton's reflector (1st)	3.3 cm (1.3")	Reflector	First reflecting telescope	England	1668–1704

* (First light or Build Completion to Inactive or Deconstruction)

== Gallery ==
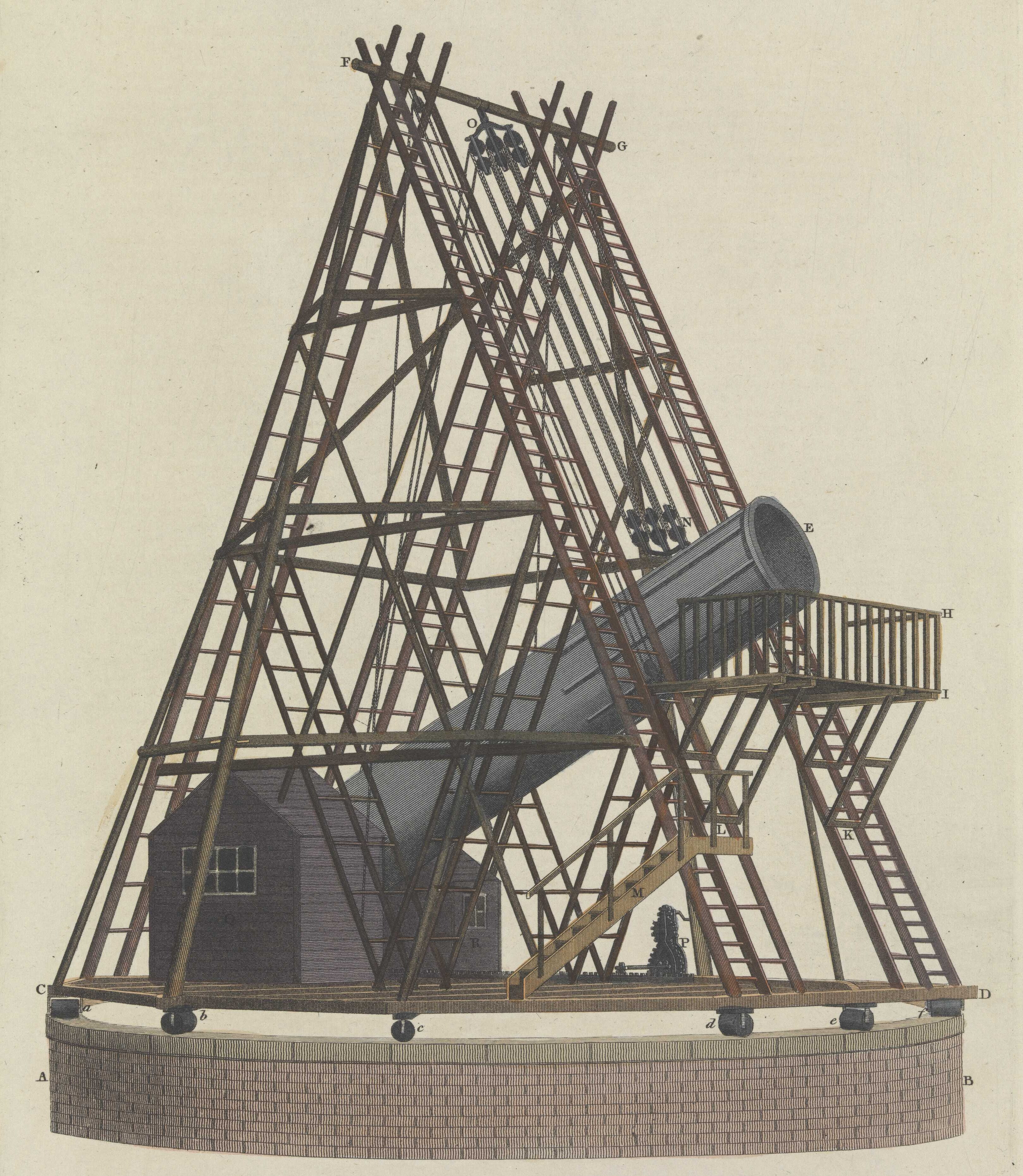
The 40-foot (12 m) telescope

== See also ==
- Lists of telescopes
- List of largest optical telescopes in the 19th century
- List of largest optical telescopes in the 20th century
- List of largest optical telescopes historically
- List of largest optical reflecting telescopes
- Peter Dollond
