= Father Noël =

Benedictine monk and telescope maker

Nicolas Noël (1712-1781) was a Benedictine monk, instrument and telescope maker at the workshop of l'abbaye de Saint-Germain des Prés. He became custodian of Louis XV's telescopes in 1759, having presented an eight foot (focal length) telescope to the king, under the sponsorship of the duc de Chaulnes, on December 14, 1756. Between 1759 and 1774 Dom Noël assembled a collection of his own instruments and those acquired from others in buildings erected for the purpose adjacent to the Château de la Muette. Noêl's position was later held by Abbé Rochon. In 1772 Noël made a 22-inch diameter 24-foot focus Gregorian, which at the time was the largest telescope in the world. The speculum mirror was re-polished by Carochez in 1787. It was installed in Paris at the Hôtel de la Muette (also known as the Cabinet de Passy). The "Grand Telescope of Passy" was too large and cumbersome to serve as an effective scientific instrument, and after being re-mirrored in 1800 was dismantled in 1841.

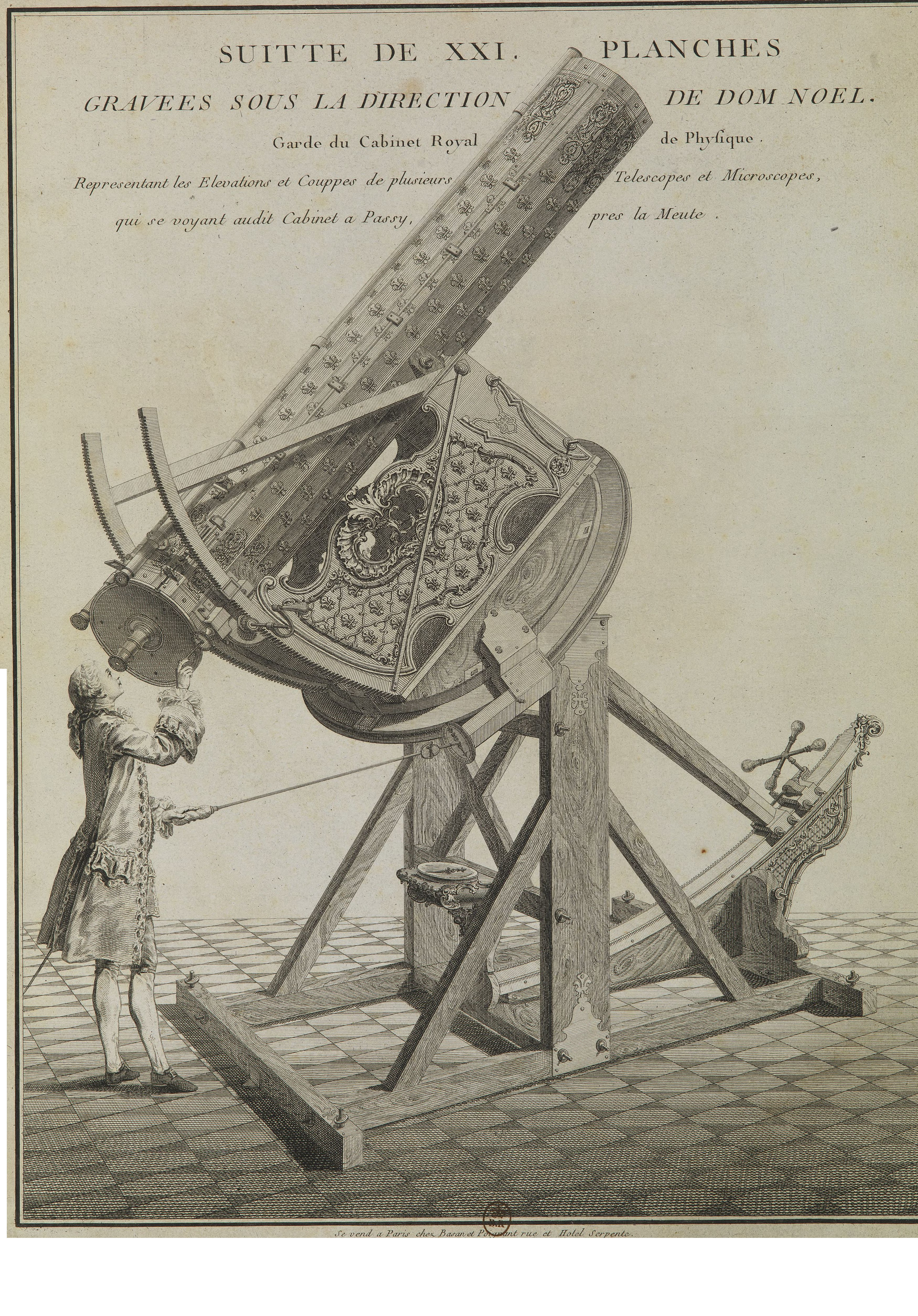
Eight-Foot Telescope created by Nicolas Noel for the Cabinet de Passy of Louis XV
