= Francesco Bianchini =

Italian philosopher and scientist

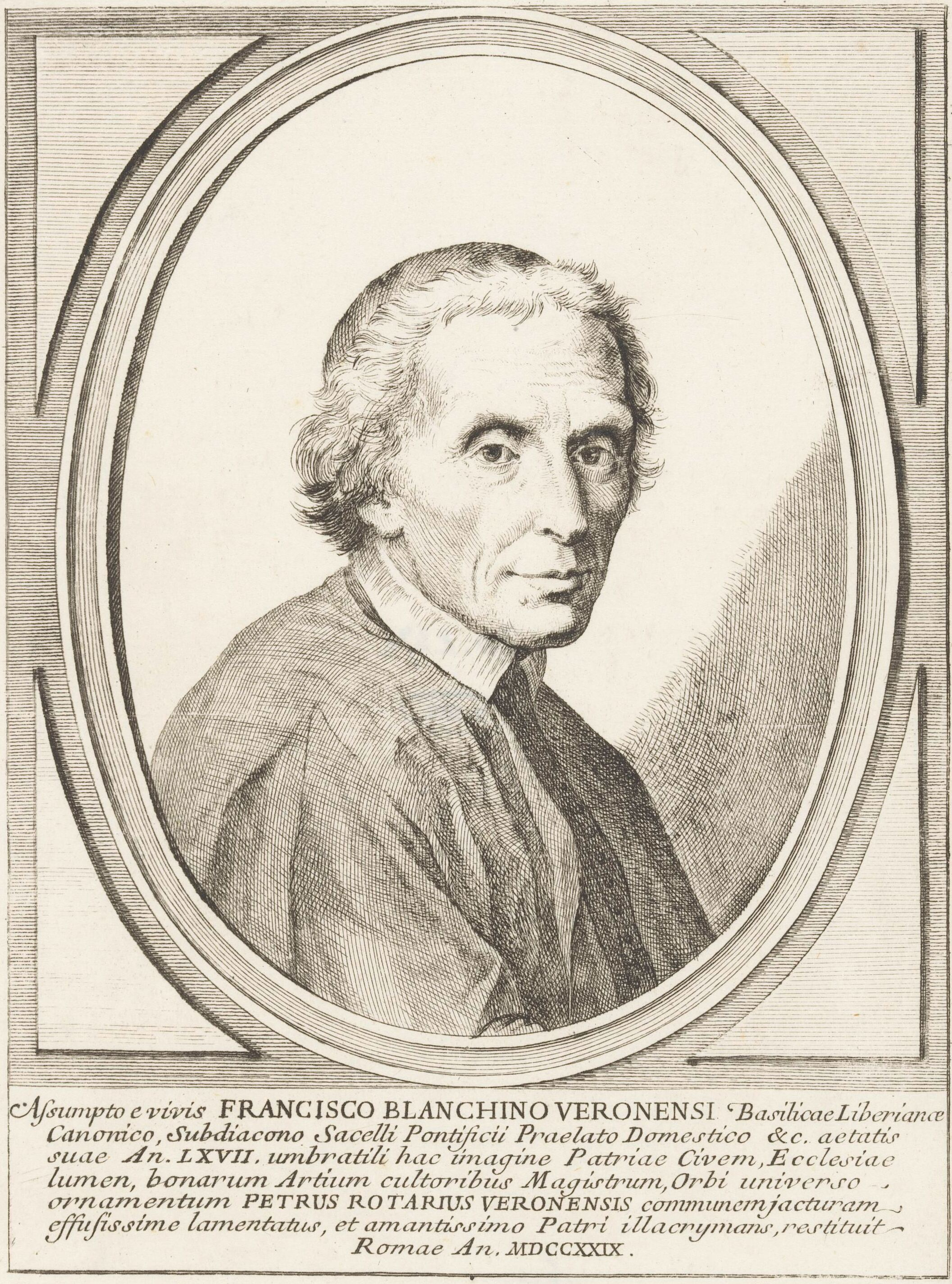
- Born: 13 December 1662; Verona, Republic of Venice
- Died: 2 March 1729; Rome, Papal States
- Burial place: Verona Cathedral
- Education: University of Padua
- Occupations: Astronomer, historian, art historian, Catholic priest
- Movement: Scientific Revolution

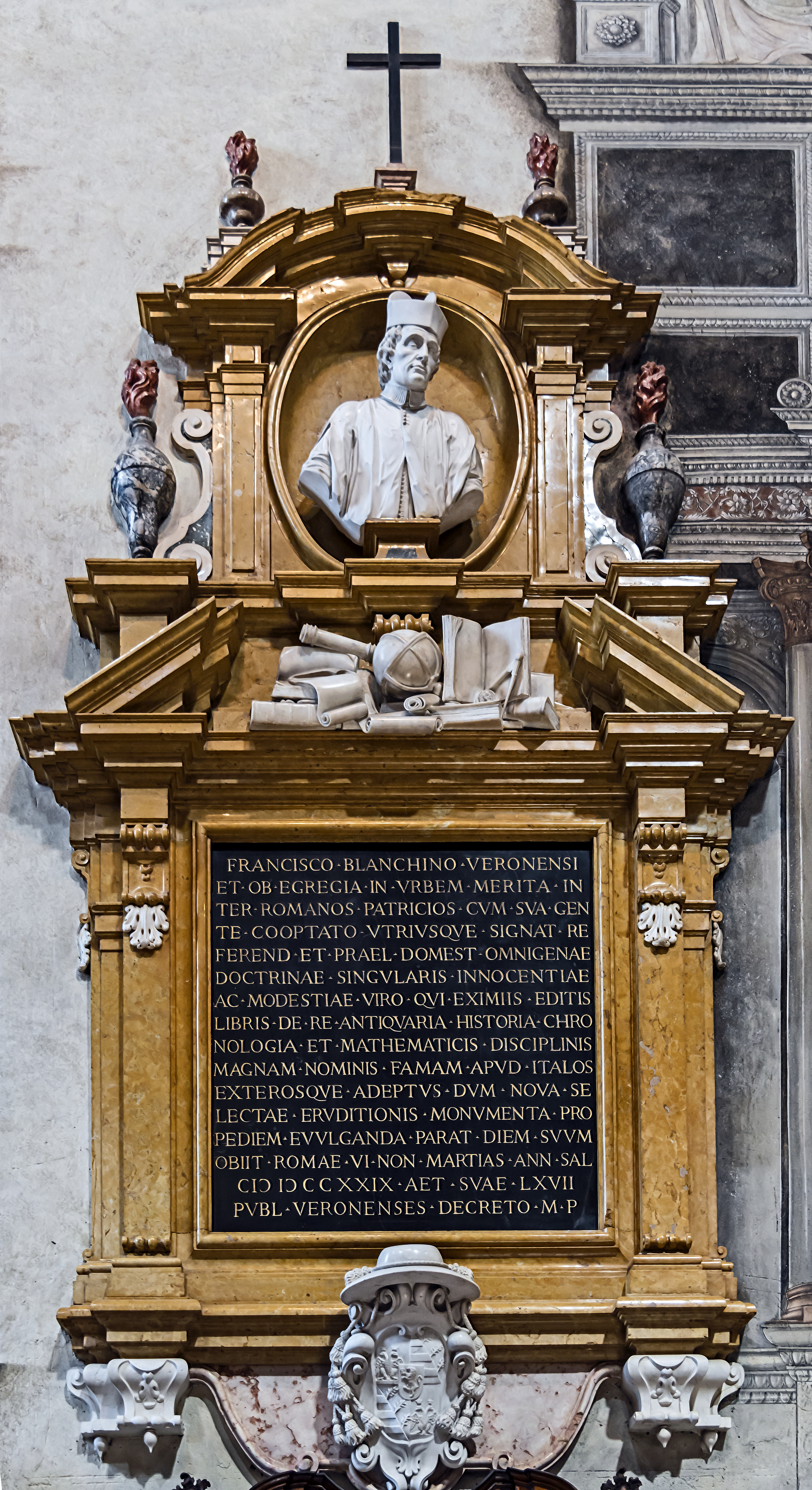
Monument in the Cathedral of Verona

Francesco Bianchini FRS (13 December 1662 – 2 March 1729) was an Italian philosopher and scientist. He worked for the curia of three popes, including being camiere d'honore of Clement XI, and secretary of the commission for the reform of the calendar, working on the method to calculate the astronomically correct date for Easter in a given year.

== Life and work ==
Bianchini was born of a noble family at Verona, the son of Giuseppe Bianchini and his wife, Cornelia Vailetti. Educated by Jesuits in Bologna, and by the Paduan astronomer, Geminiano Montanari, Bianchini spent most of his university years in Padua studying comets while enrolled in Theology. This early training in astronomy established Bianchini's commitment to the experimental and physical sciences. In 1684 he went to Rome, and became librarian to Cardinal Ottoboni, who, as Pope Alexander VIII (1689), raised him to the offices of papal chamberlain and canon of Santa Maria Maggiore. Clement XI sent him on a mission to Paris in 1712, and employed him to form a museum of Christian antiquities. A paper by him on Giovanni Domenico Cassini's new method of parallaxes was inserted in the Acta Eruditorum of Leipzig in 1685.

He was elected a Fellow of the Royal Society of London in January 1713 after being proposed by Sir Isaac Newton. On 9 January 1706, Bianchini was elected member of the French Academy of Sciences of Paris.

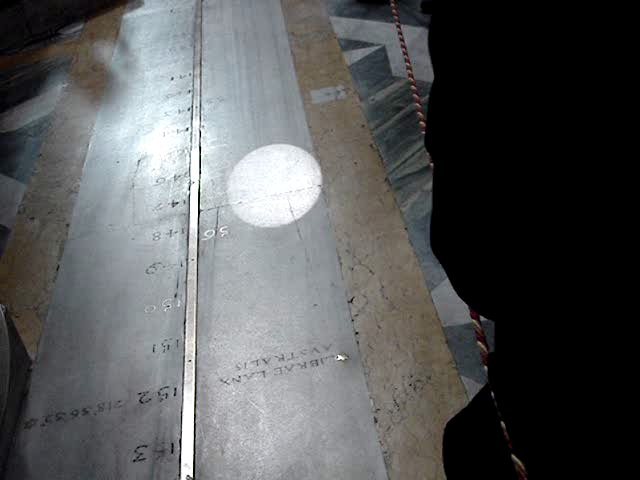
A gnomon in the south wall of the Santa Maria degli Angeli e dei Martiri projects the sun's image onto Bianchini's line every solar noon

His deduction of a rotational period of Venus was based on the observation of its surface using a 2.6" (66mm) 100-foot focal length aerial telescope. Today, we know that this is impossible, because of the thick cloud cover on this planet. He also worked on the parallax of Venus, and he measured the precession of the Earth's rotational axis.

As part of his efforts to improve the accuracy of the calendar, Bianchini was commissioned by Clement XI to construct an important meridian line in the Basilica of Santa Maria degli Angeli e dei Martiri (the Basilica of Saint Mary of the Angels and the Martyrs) in Rome, a device for calculating the position of the sun and stars.

According to a Catholic News Service online news story by Carol Glatz from 5 August 2011, Pope Benedict XVI noted this when he explained the importance of astronomy – especially when clocks were primitive and prone to error – in the determination of certain liturgical celebration days and the times for certain daily prayers, such as the Angelus.

His point of view on the Copernican system is not evident, but it was noted that the picture of the planetary system in his book about Venus has an empty centre.

42775 Bianchini, an asteroid, Craters on Mars and the Bianchini crater on the Moon are named in his honour. (Note: Not to be confused with Giovanni Bianchini (no known relation), an earlier Italian scientist with a lunar crater named after him.)

He also worked as a topographer and archaeologist of ancient Rome, and as a collector. In 1726, a structure (the columbarium of Livia) consisting of three sepulchral chambers of some of the servants and freedmen of Augustus and his wife Livia were discovered near the Via Appia, and excavated. Bianchini explored these rooms and published a description. In 1727, he fell through the ceiling of a vault while exploring the ruins of the palace of the Caesars on the Palatine Hill (Palace of Domitian), and was severely injured.

He died in Rome on 2 March 1729, and was buried in Santa Maria Maggiore. A monument was raised to his memory in Verona Cathedral.

== Books ==
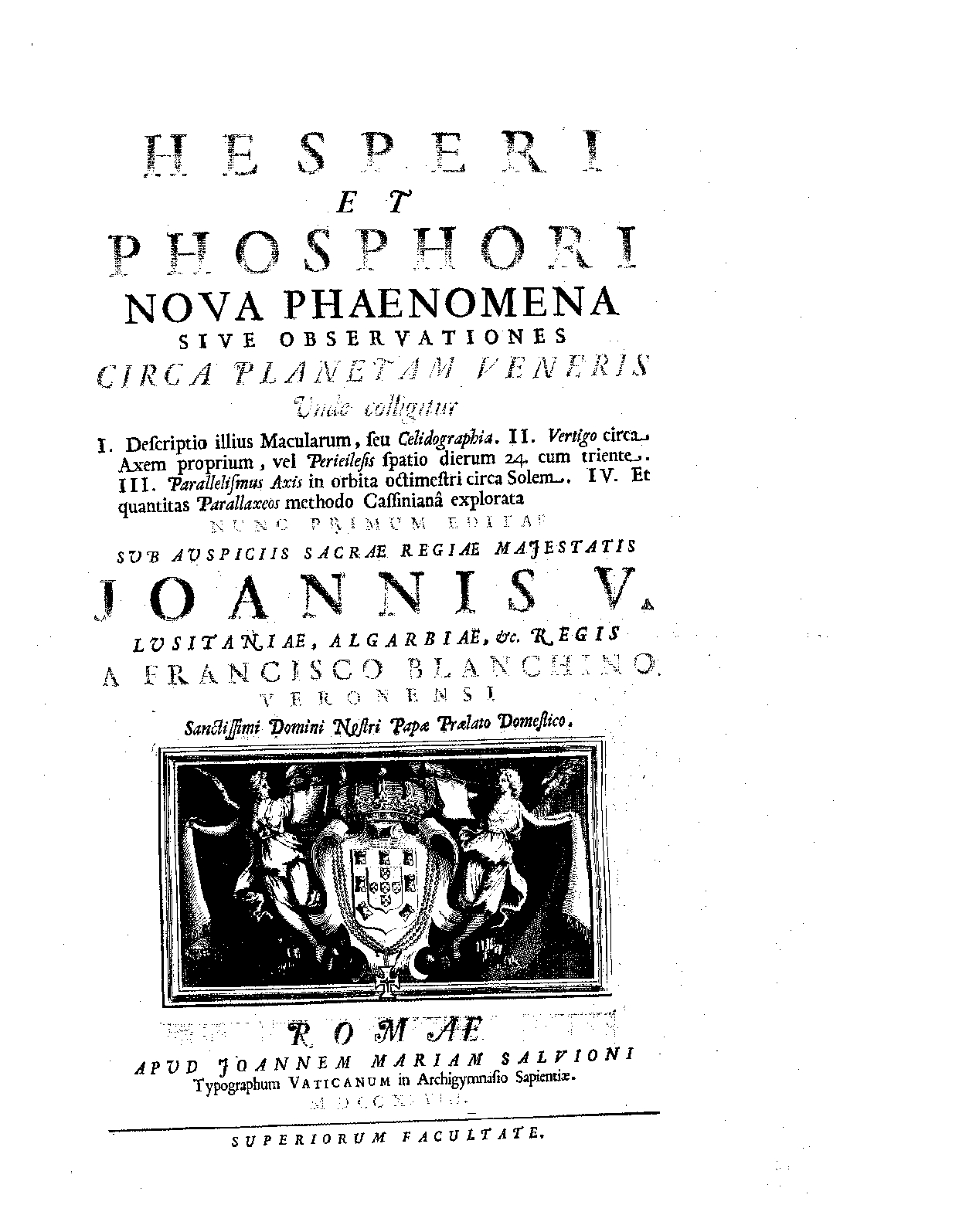
Hesperi et Phosphori nova phaenomena, 1728

He published many books, including:

- Storia universale, provata co' monumenti, e figurata co' simboli degli antichi (Rome, 1697 and 1747)
- De Calendario et Cyclo Caesaris (1703)
- De vitis romanorum pontificum a Petro Apost. ad Nicolaum I. 4 vol. (Rome, 1718–35)
- Camera Ed Inscrizioni Sepulcrali De' Liberti, Servi, ed Ufficiali della Casa di Augusto Scoperte nella Via Appia, ed illustrate Con le Annotazioni (Rome, 1727)
- Hesperi et Phosphori nova phaenomena sive observationes circa planetam Veneris (Rome, 1728), in which he asserted Venus to rotate in 24 days and 8 hours.
- Astronomicae et Geographicae Observationes Selectae (1737) (posthumously)
- Del Palazzo de Cesari Opera Postuma (Verona, 1738) (posthumously)
- De Tribus Generibus Instrumentorum Musicae Veterum Organicae (Rome, 1742) (posthumously) A treatise on the musical instruments of Greece and Rome.
- Opuscula Varia (1754) (posthumously).

== See also ==
- List of largest optical telescopes in the 18th century
