= List of largest optical telescopes in the British Isles =

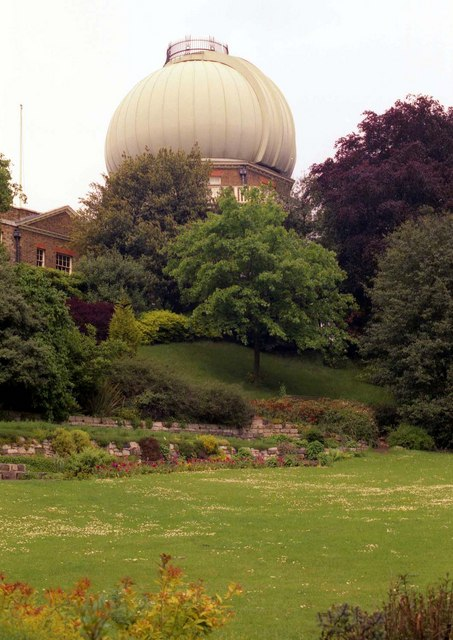
The 28-inch (71 cm) Grubb refractor's dome at Greenwich.

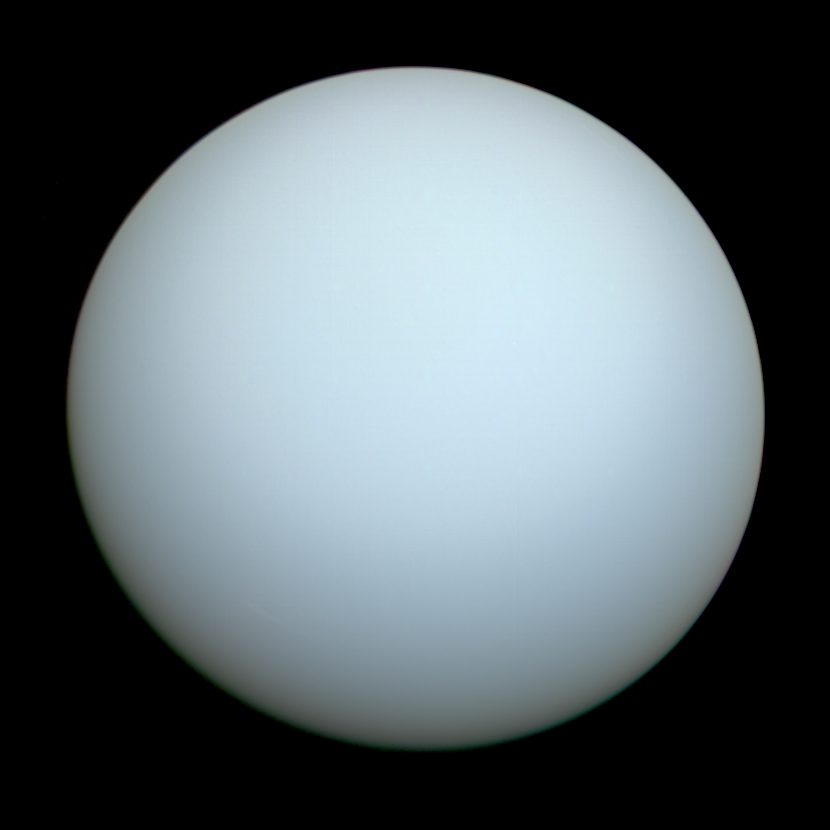
The discovery of Georgium Sidus, later known as Uranus, was one of the famous astronomical discoveries made from the British Isles.

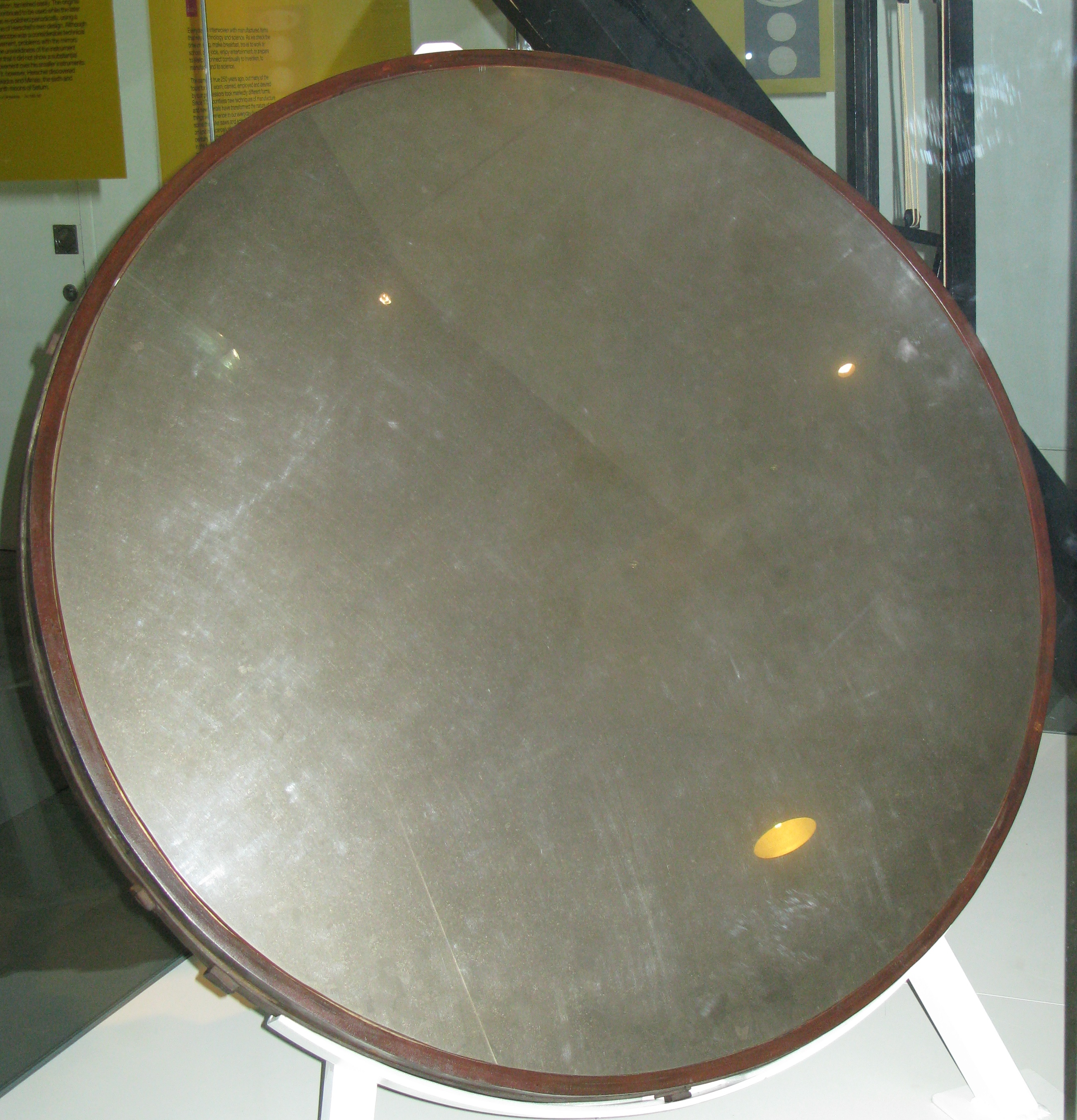
The mirror from the 40-foot telescope, on display at the Science Museum, London.

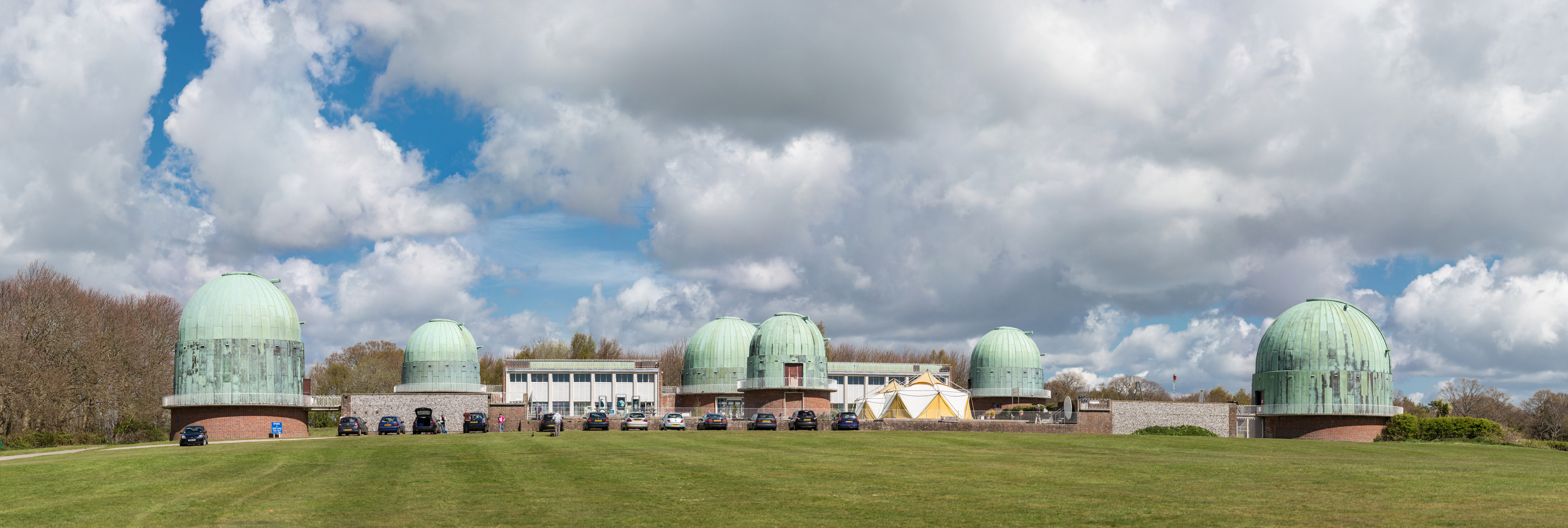
Former Royal Greenwich Observatory, Herstmonceux, East Sussex; this was an important site for telescopes in the latter 20th century in England.

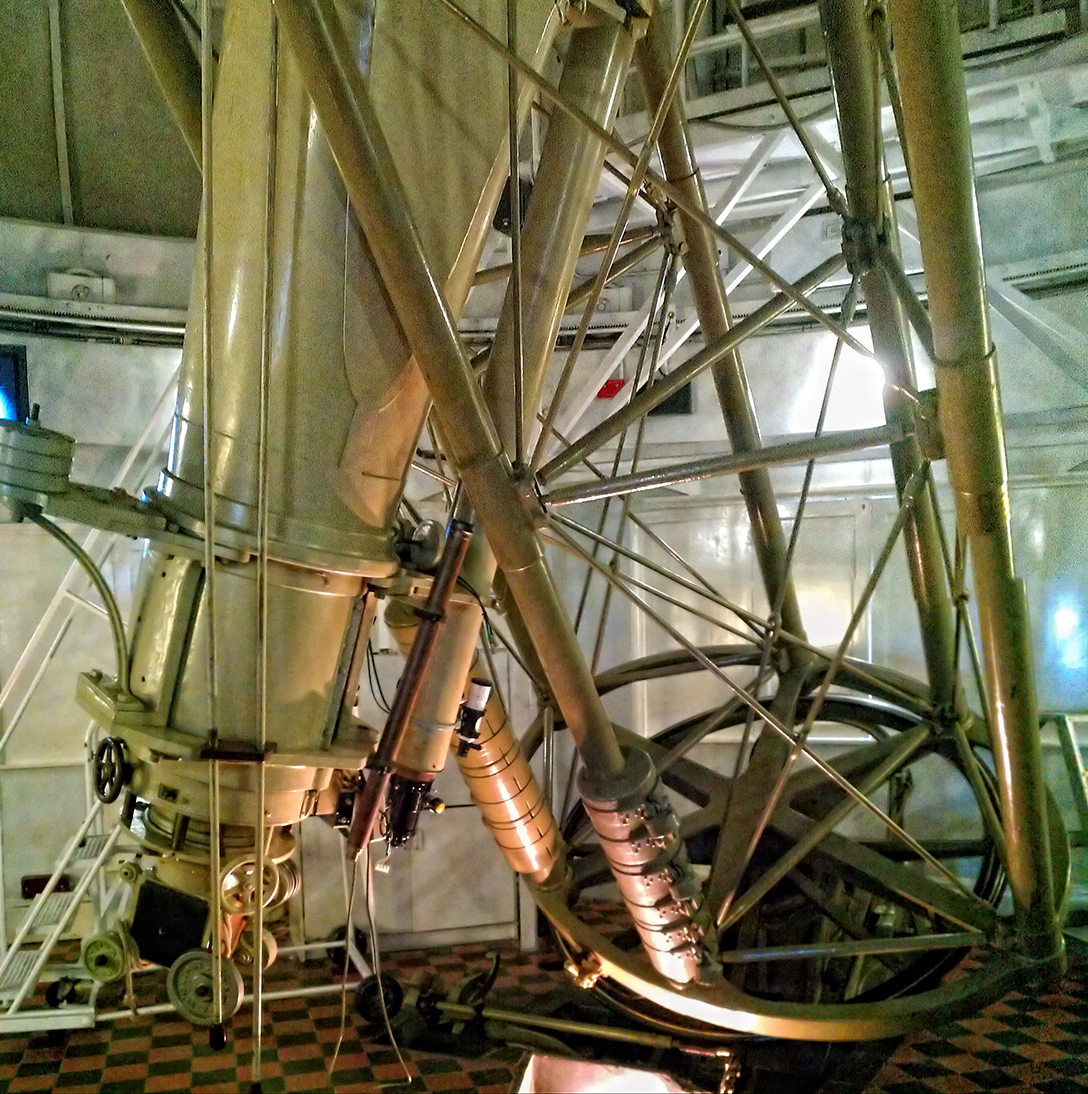
Closeup of lower end of a 28-inch (71 cm) aperture telescope.

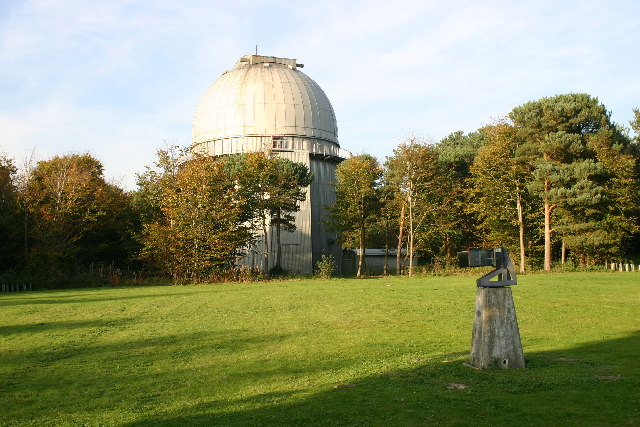
The old Isaac Newton Telescope dome.

This is a list of the largest optical telescopes in the British Isles, including in the United Kingdom and Ireland.

Several historically important telescopes were located in this region. Those include William Herschel's reflecting 40-foot telescope, with which he discovered Uranus. The 72-inch (1.83-metre) Leviathan of Parsonstown had the largest aperture in the world for several decades.

The largest optical telescope that ever operated in the British Isles was the Isaac Newton Telescope, which had a 98-inch (2.5 m) mirror. It was located at the Royal Greenwich Observatory, Herstmonceux from 1965 to 1980, but was then relocated to Roque de los Muchachos Observatory on La Palma, Canary Islands.

The British Isles no longer hosts large optical telescopes used for research. By the 20th century, the UK (and to a lesser extent Ireland) was building and operating large telescopes overseas, for better weather, seeing or access to different targets. Many older telescopes are now tourist attractions. There are also modest-sized telescopes at universities and science museums, used for student education, training, or outreach purposes.

== Current list ==
The following is a non-comprehensive list of optical telescopes currently located in the British Isles with an aperture of 24 inches (61 cm) or greater:

Reflecting telescopes
Name	Effective aperture	Type	Location	Operator	First light	Notes
Rosse Six Foot Telescope (reconstructed)	72 in (183 cm)	Newtonian reflector	Birr, Leinster (Republic of Ireland)	Birr Castle	1999	Largest optical telescope in Ireland.
38-inch Congo Schmidt	38 in (96.5 cm)	Reflector	Herstmonceux, East Sussex (England)	The Observatory Science Centre	1960	Largest optical telescope in UK, but never used due to flawed optics.
James Gregory Telescope	37 in (94 cm)	Cassegrain reflector	St Andrews, Fife (Scotland)	University of St Andrews	1962	Largest operational optical telescope in the UK.
Cambridge 36-inch telescope	36 in (91.4 cm)	Reflector	Cambridge, Cambridgeshire (England)	University of Cambridge	1955	Largest optical telescope still in use in England.
36-inch Yapp telescope	36 in (91.4 cm)	Reflector	Herstmonceux, East Sussex (England)	The Observatory Science Centre	1932	
Edinburgh 36-inch telescope	36 in (91.4 cm)	Reflector	Edinburgh (Scotland)	Royal Observatory Edinburgh	1930	No longer operational.
34-inch Hewitt Camera	34 in (86.4 cm)	Reflector	Herstmonceux, East Sussex (England)	The Observatory Science Centre	1950s	
Perren Telescope	31.5 in (80 cm)	Ritchey–Chrétien reflector	Mill Hill, London (England)	UCL Observatory	2019	
Thomson/Regan/Owen Reflector	30 in (76.2 cm)	Reflector	Great Sutton, Cheshire (England)	David Thomson	2023	
John Wall refractor	30 in (76.2 cm)	Refractor	Hanwell, Oxfordshire (England)	Hanwell Community Observatory	1999	Largest refractor in the British Isles.
30" Dobsonian	30 in (76.2 cm)	Reflector	Todmorden, West Yorkshire (England)	The Astronomy Centre	1986	
Thompson 30-inch Reflector	30 in (76.2 cm)	Reflector	Herstmonceux, East Sussex (England)	The Observatory Science Centre	1896	
Greenwich 28-inch refractor	28 in (71.1 cm)	Refractor	Greenwich, London (England)	Royal Observatory, Greenwich	1893	
Moses Holden Telescope	27.6 in (70.1 cm)	Reflector	Preston, Lancashire (England)	University of Lancashire	2015	
Thompson 26-inch Refractor	26 in (66 cm)	Refractor	Herstmonceux, East Sussex (England)	The Observatory Science Centre	1897	
24 / 17" Schmidt Camera	24 in (61 cm)	Reflector	Knighton, Powys (Wales)	The Spaceguard Centre	1950	Largest optical telescope in Wales.
Thornton Telescope	24 in (61 cm)	Reflector	Keele, Staffordshire (England)	Keele University	1975	
24" Telescope	24 in (61 cm)	Reflector	Sherwood Observatory, Nottinghamshire (England)	Sherwood Observatory	1984	
24" Telescope	24 in (61 cm)	Reflector	Bayfordbury, Hertfordshire (England)	University of Hertfordshire	2021	

== Historical ==
- Isaac Newton Telescope at Herstmonceux, 98 in (249 cm) (1965–1979)
- Leviathan of Parsonstown, 1842–c. 1890
- 3-foot telescope at Parsons
- RGO telescopes at different points in its history
  - 38-inch Hargreaves Reflector (1960)
  - Yapp 36-inch Reflector (1932)
  - 30-inch Steavenson Reflector (1939)
  - 28-inch Refractor (1893)
  - Thompson Telescope with a 26-inch refractor and 30-inch reflector on one mounting (1896)
  - Lassell 2-foot Reflector (1845)
  - Isaac Roberts 20-inch reflector (1885)
  - Western Equatorial (c. 1824)
  - 13-inch Astrographic Refractor (1890)
  - Merz 12.8-inch Visual Refractor (1859–1893) (this was replaced by the 28-inch Grubb in the onion dome)
  - Thomson 9-inch Photographic Refractor (c. 1888)
  - Sheepshanks refractor 6.7-inch (1838) (a.k.a. Sheepshanks Equatorial)
  - 6-inch Franklin Adams Camera (1898)
  - Shuckburgh telescope a 4.1-inch aperture Refractor (1791)
- At the Observatory Science Center (at Herstmonceux)
  - Hargreaves 38-inch Congo Schmidt
  - Yapp 36-inch reflector
  - Thompson 30-inch reflector
  - Thompson 26-inch reflector
- Markree Observatory 13.3" Cauchoix (the largest refractor of the early 1830s)
- A.A. Commons reflectors (later reworked into Crossley and Harvard telescopes)
- Lassel's reflector, this 24-inch metal mirror telescope was used to discover the moons Triton and Hyperion.
- Newton's reflector
- 40-foot telescope (England)
- Armagh Observatory 15-inch Grubb reflecting telescope. Specula metal mirror mounted on an equatorial, with clockwork-drive.
- Bedford Observatory Tully 5.9-inch refractor (8.5 feet focal length); Dollond mount with Sheepshanks clockwork drive.
- Cambridge Observatory 36-inch (3 feet = 91.44 cm) aperture reflector

== Observations ==
A noted accomplishment of the biggest telescope at the time, Ross's "six foot" leviathan, was the observation of the spiral structure of M51, which was presented at Cambridge in the summer of 1845. Herschel was also quite prolific discovering a planet and many moons of the Solar system with his reflectors.

== See also ==
- Lists of telescopes
- List of telescopes of Australia
- David Dunlap Observatory (Largest telescope of the British Empire in the 1930s)
