= Lists of telescopes =

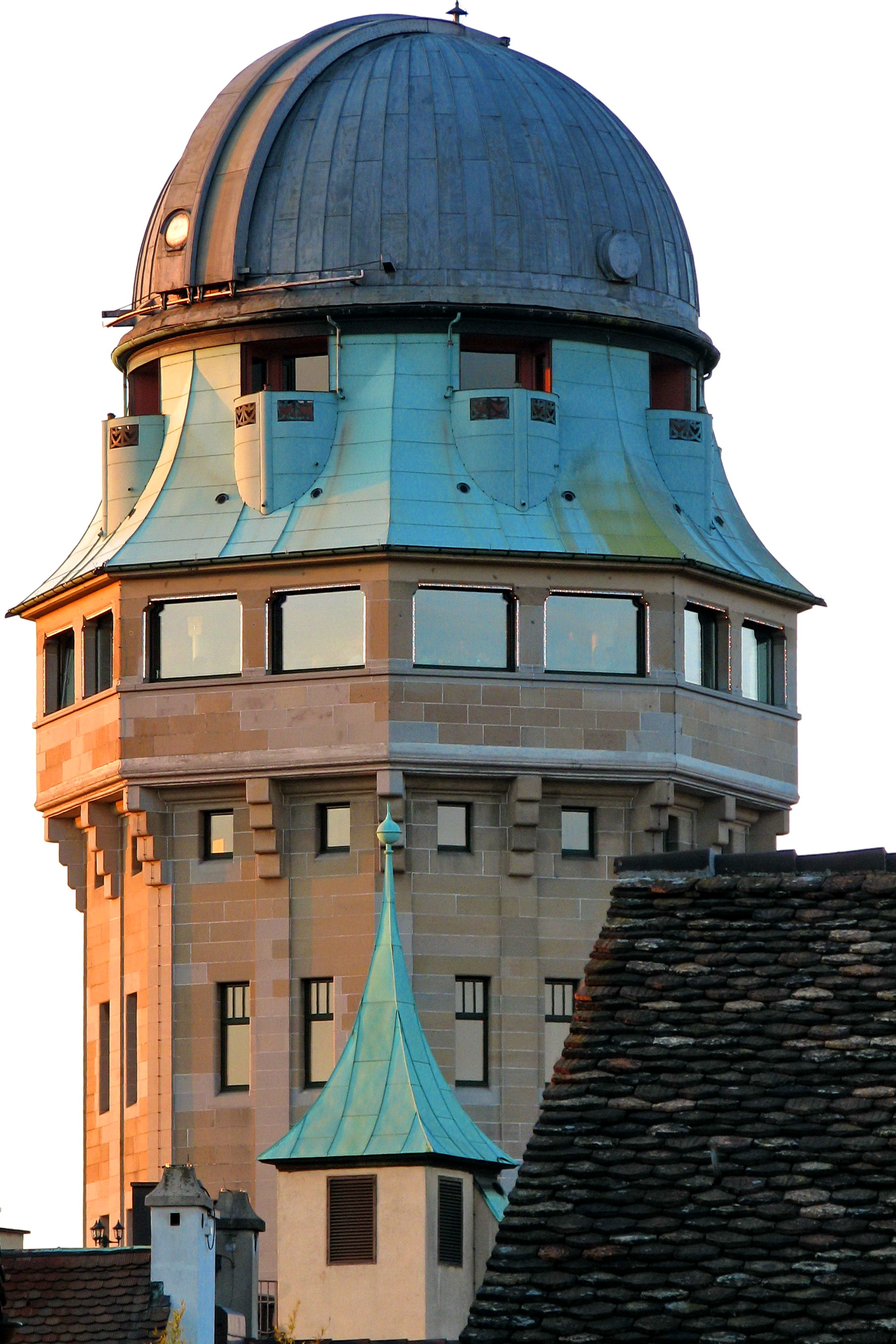
Dome of Zurich's great refractor at the Urania Sternwarte

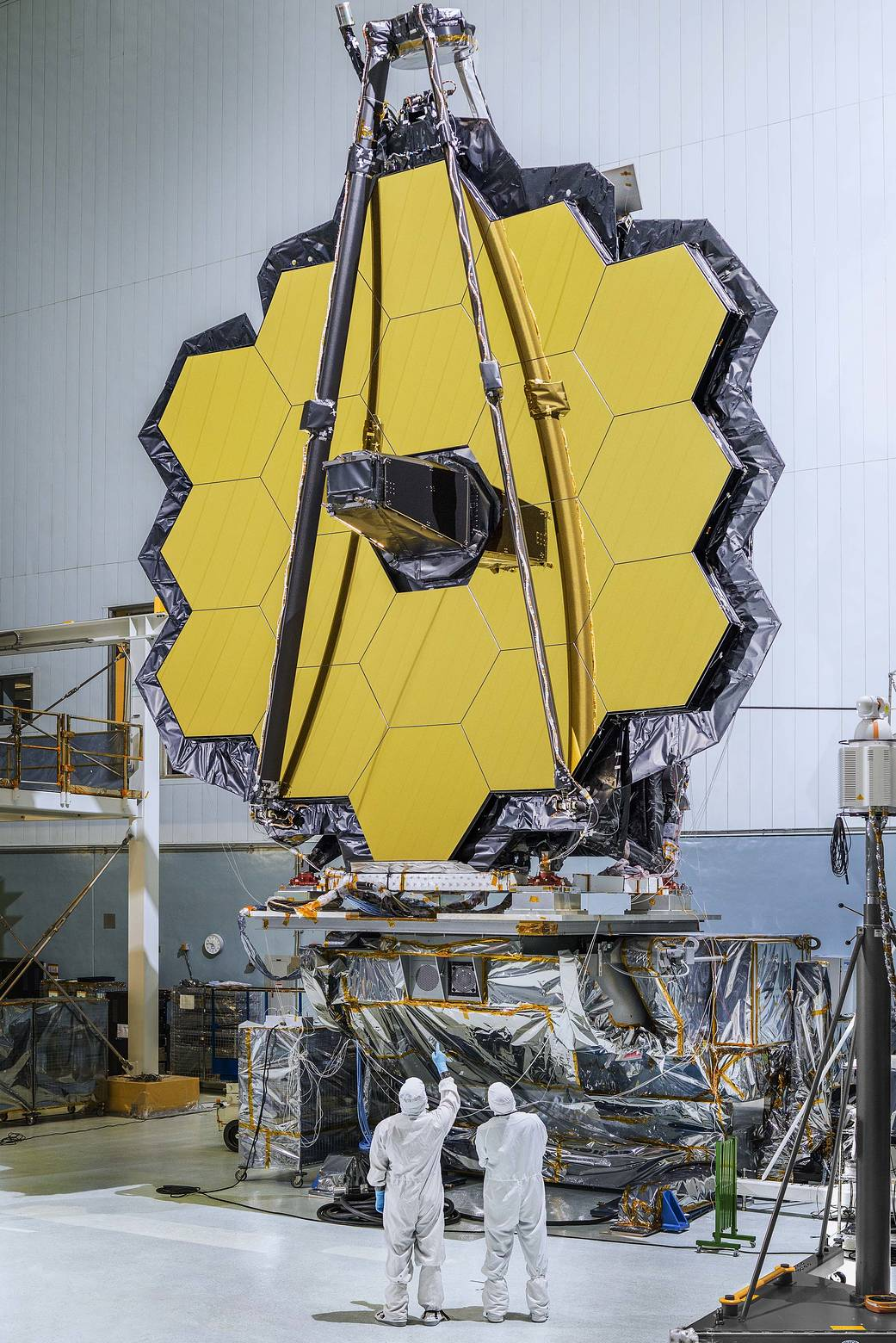
Prime mirror of the James Webb Space Telescope

This is a list of lists of telescopes.

- List of telescope types
- List of telescope parts and construction
- List of astronomical interferometers at visible and infrared wavelengths
- List of astronomical observatories
- List of highest astronomical observatories
- List of large optical telescopes
- List of largest optical telescopes historically
- List of largest optical telescopes in the 18th century
- List of largest optical telescopes in the 19th century
- List of largest optical telescopes in the 20th century
- List of largest optical reflecting telescopes
- List of largest optical refracting telescopes
- List of space telescopes
- List of proposed space telescopes
- List of radio telescopes
- List of solar telescopes
- List of telescopes of Australia
- List of largest optical telescopes in the British Isles
- List of the largest optical telescopes in North America

== See also ==
- Lists of astronauts
- Lists of astronomical objects
- List of government space agencies
- List of planetariums
- Lists of space scientists
- Lists of spacecraft
