= Aerial telescope =

Tubeless telescope (17th century)

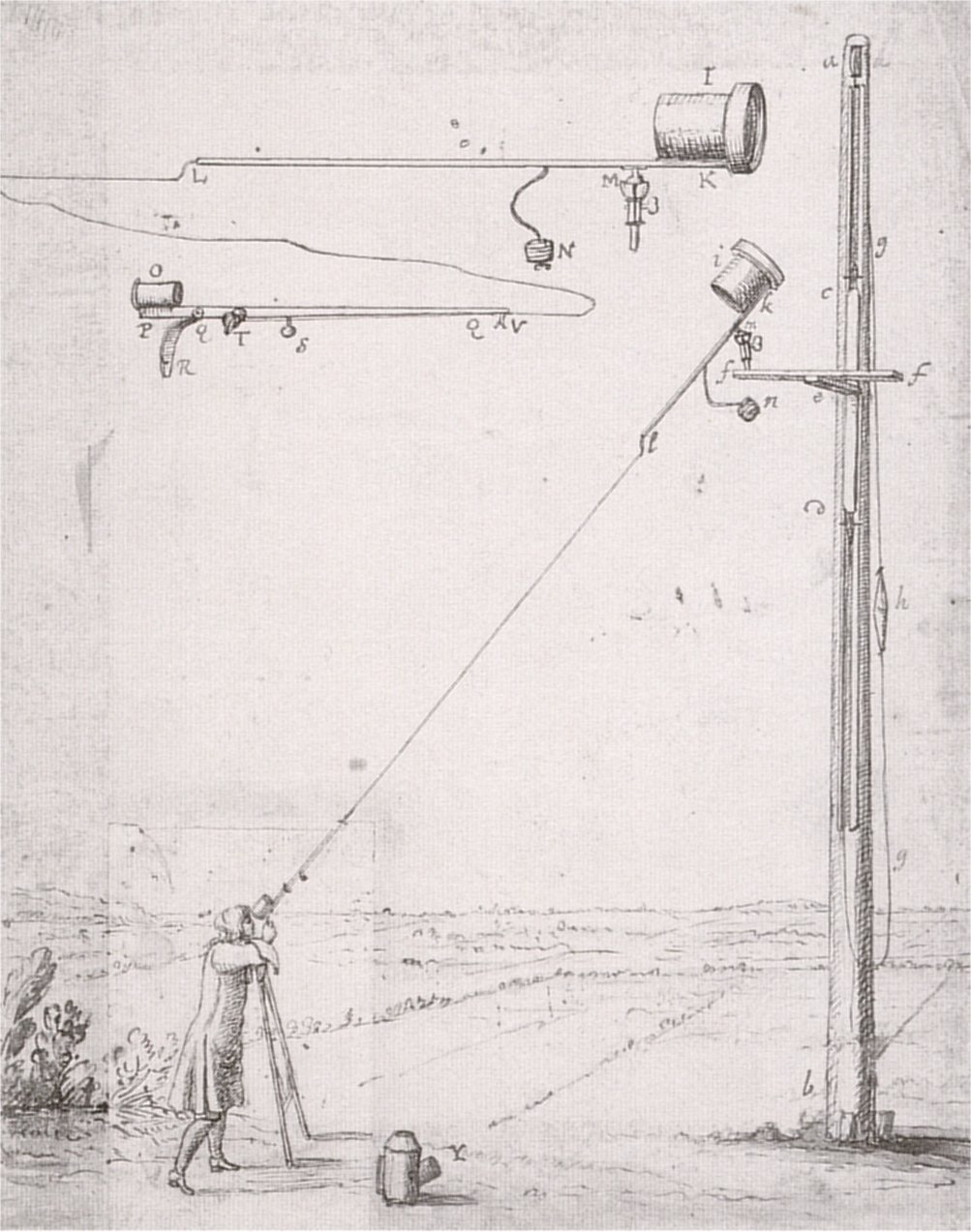
An engraving of Huygens's 210-foot aerial telescope showing the eyepiece and objective mounts and connecting string

An aerial telescope is a type of very long focal length refracting telescope, built in the second half of the 17th century, that did not use a tube. Instead, the objective was mounted on a pole, tree, tower, building or other structure on a swivel ball-joint. The observer stood on the ground and held the eyepiece, which was connected to the objective by a string or connecting rod. By holding the string tight and maneuvering the eyepiece, the observer could aim the telescope at objects in the sky. The idea for this type of telescope may have originated in the late 17th century with the Dutch mathematician, astronomer and physicist Christiaan Huygens and his brother Constantijn Huygens, Jr., though it is not clear if they actually invented it.

== Predecessors: very long "tubed" telescopes ==
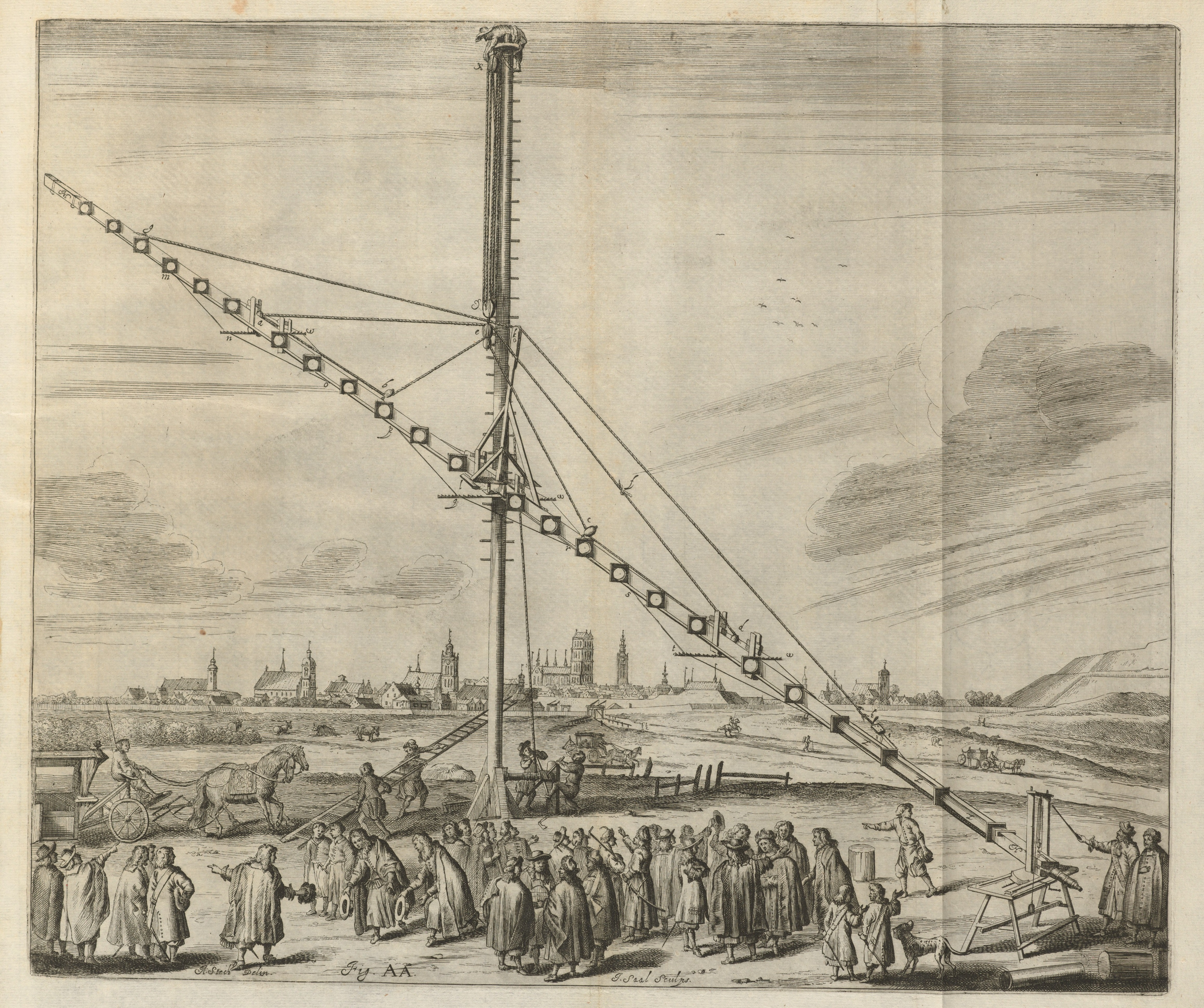
1673 engraved illustration of Johannes Hevelius's 8-inch telescope with an open work wood and wire "tube" that had a focal length of 150 feet to limit chromatic aberration

Telescopes built in the 17th and early 18th century used single element non-achromatic objective lenses that suffered from interfering rainbow halos (chromatic aberration) introduced by the non-uniform refractive properties of single glass lenses. This degraded the quality of the images they produced. Telescope makers from that era found that very long focal length objectives had no appreciable chromatic aberration (the uncorrected chromatic aberration fell within the large diffraction pattern at focus). They also realized that when they doubled the diameter of their objectives they had to make the objective's focal length 4 times as long (focal length had to be squared) to achieve the same amount of minimal chromatic aberration. As the objective diameter of these refracting telescopes was increased to gather more light and resolve finer detail they began to have focal lengths as long as 150 feet. Besides having very long tubes, these telescopes needed scaffolding or long masts and cranes to hold them up. Their value as research tools was minimal since the telescope's support frame and tube flexed and vibrated in the slightest breeze and sometimes collapsed altogether.

== Invention of tubeless "aerial" telescopes ==
Around 1675 the brothers Christiaan and Constantijn Huygens decided to accommodate the very long focal length objectives they were creating by eliminating the tube altogether. In the Huygens' "aerial" telescope the objective was mounted inside a short iron tube mounted on a swiveling ball-joint on top of an adjustable mast. The eyepiece was mounted in another short tube (sometimes on a stand), and the two tubes were kept aligned by a taut connecting string. Christiaan Huygens published designs for these tubeless "aerial telescopes" in his 1684 book Astroscopia Compendiaria, and their invention has been attributed to him and his brother Constantijn, although similar designs were also used by Adrien Auzout; the idea is even sometimes attributed to Christopher Wren.

The Huygenses contrived some ingenious arrangements for aiming these "aerial telescopes" at an object visible in the night sky. The telescope could be aimed at bright objects such as planets by looking for their image cast on a white pasteboard ring or oiled translucent paper screen and then centering them in the eyepiece. Fainter objects could be found by looking for the reflection of a lamp held in the observer's hand being bounced back by the objective and then centering that reflection on the object. Other contrivances for the same purpose are described by Philippe de la Hire and by Nicolaas Hartsoeker. The objectives for aerial telescopes sometimes had very long focal lengths. Christiaan Huygens states that in 1686 he and his brother made objectives of 8 inch (200 mm) and 8.5 inch (220 mm) diameter and 170 and 210 ft (52 and 64 m) focal length, respectively. Constantijn Huygens, Jr. presented a 7.5 inch (190 mm) diameter 123 ft (37.5 m) focal length objective to the Royal Society of London in 1690. Adrien Auzout and others made telescopes of from 300 to 600 ft (90 to 180 m) focal length, and Auzout proposed a huge aerial telescope 1,000 ft in length that he would use "to observe animals on the Moon".

== Applications ==
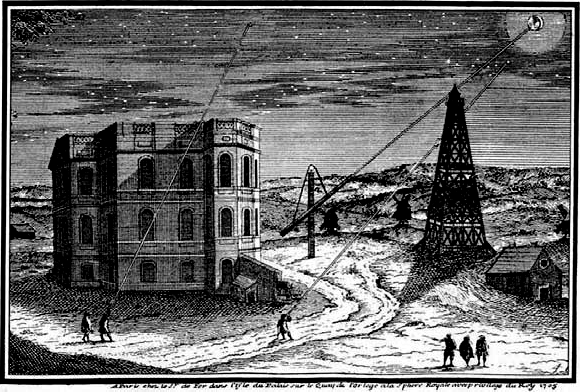
An engraving of The Paris Observatory in the beginning of the 18th century with the wooden "Marly Tower" on the right

Astronomer Giovanni Domenico Cassini had the wooden Marly Tower, originally built as part of the Machine de Marly to lift water for the reservoirs and fountains at the Gardens of Versailles, moved to the grounds of the Paris Observatory. On this tower he mounted long tubed telescopes and the objectives of aerial telescopes made for him by the Italian optician Giuseppe Campani. In 1684 he used one of his aerial telescopes to find Dione and Tethys, two satellites of Saturn. James Bradley, on December 27, 1722, measured the diameter of Venus with an aerial telescope whose objective had a focal length of 212 ft (65 m). Francesco Bianchini tried to map the surface of that same planet and deduce its rotational period in Rome in 1726 using a 2.6" (66 mm) 100-foot focal length aerial telescope.

== Obsolescence ==
The extreme difficulty of using these very long focal length telescopes led astronomers to develop alternative designs. One was the reflecting telescope. In 1721 John Hadley showed a Newtonian reflecting telescope to the British Royal Society with a 6-inch diameter mirror. The instrument was examined by Society members James Pound and James Bradley who compared its performance to the 7.5 inch (190 mm) diameter aerial telescope built by Constantijn Huygens, Jr. that the Society had in their collection. In the comparison they noted that the Hadley reflector "will bear such a charge as to make it magnify the object as many times as the latter with its due charge", and that it represented objects as distinct, though not altogether so clear and bright as the Huygens aerial telescope.

The need for very long focal length refracting telescope objectives was finally eliminated with the invention of the achromatic lens in the middle of the 18th century.

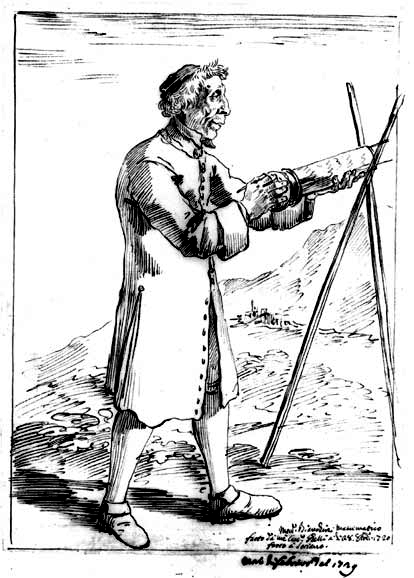
Francesco Bianchini holding another style eyepiece mount for an aerial telescope

== Replicas ==
In May 2014 a working replica of an aerial Huygens telescope was unveiled at the Old Leiden Observatory in Leiden. It was commissioned by Hans de Rijk, a Dutch science promoter. It was unveiled during the first annual Kaiser Lentelezingen (Kaiser Spring Lectures), which is a local astronomy lecture event. Unlike the original telescopes this one only has a 4-meter focal length, making it much easier to operate as compared to the original. The telescope is so far the only known fully working replica in the world. It can be seen on open days at the Old Observatory and on special request during tours.

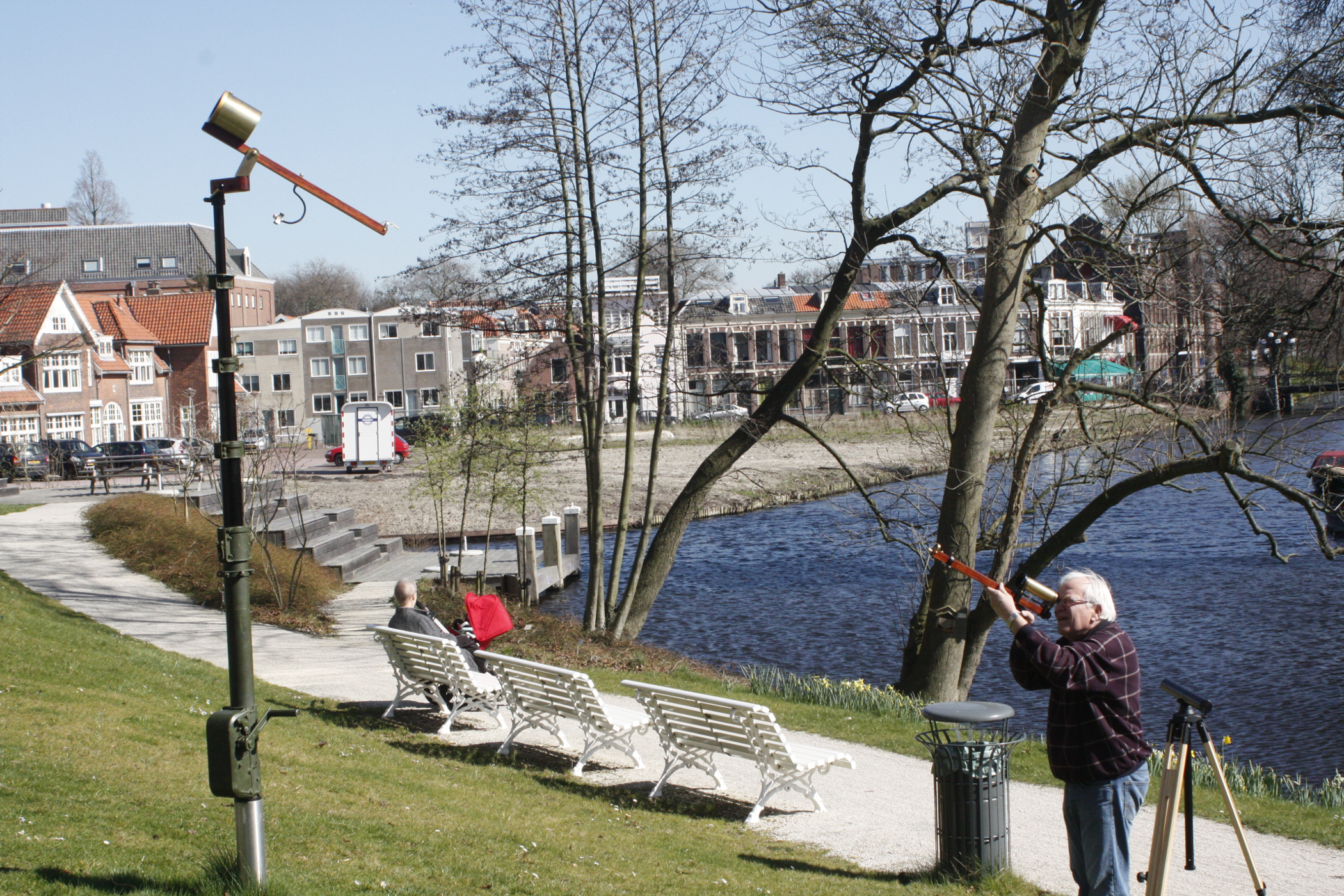
Huygens' telescope set up at the Old Observatory in Leiden

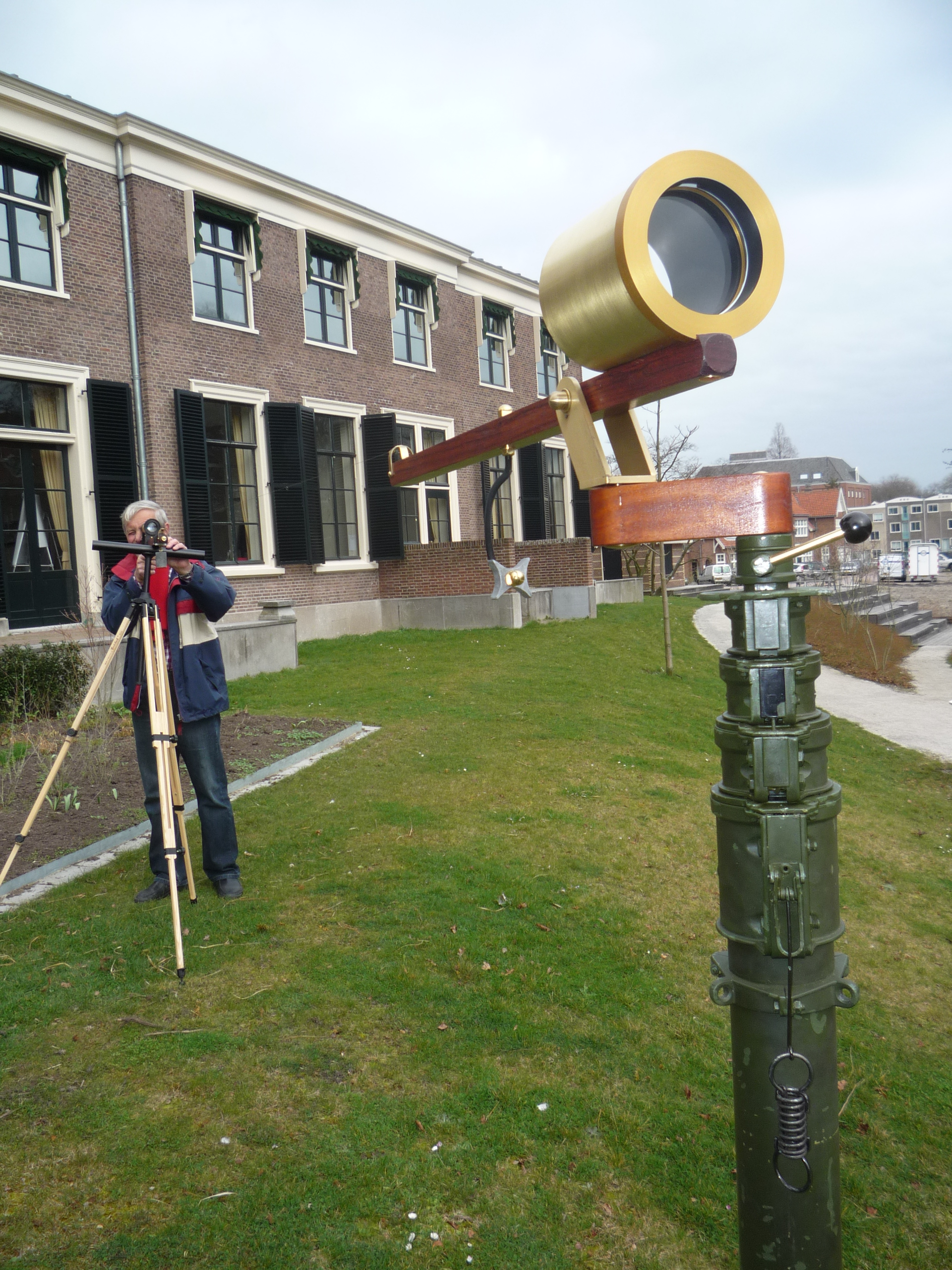
Huygens' telescope close up

== See also ==
- History of the telescope
- Infinite-axis telescope
- List of telescope types
- List of largest optical telescopes of the 18th century
