= Newton's reflector =

First successful mirror telescope

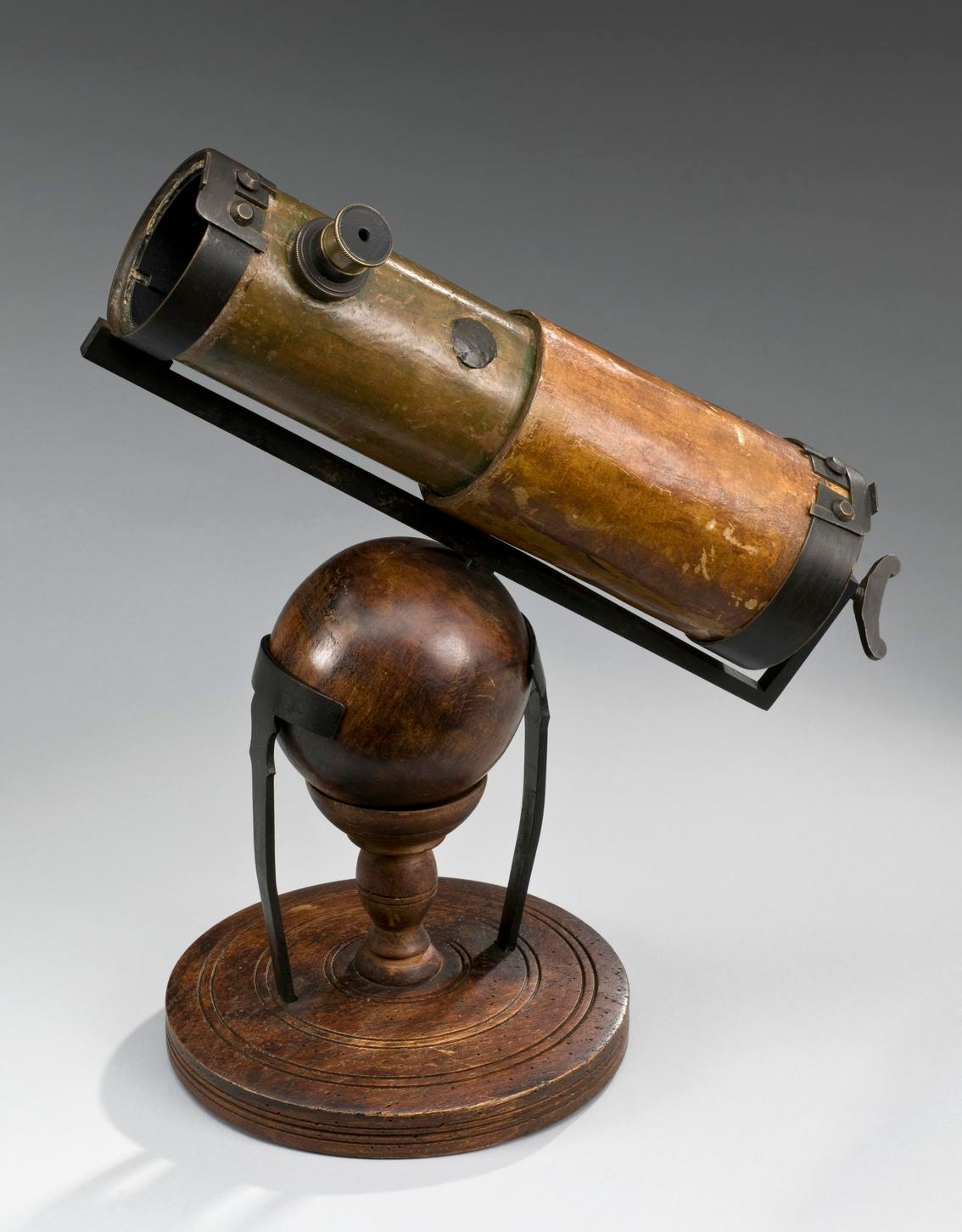
A replica of a second reflecting telescope Newton presented to the Royal Society in 1672 (the first one he made in 1668 was loaned to an instrument maker but there is no further record of what happened to it). It is described as the better of the instruments Newton built.

The first reflecting telescope built by Sir Isaac Newton in 1668 is a landmark in the history of telescopes, being the first known reflecting telescope. It was the prototype for a design that later came to be called the Newtonian telescope. There were some early prototypes and also modern replicas of this design.

== Description ==
Isaac Newton built his reflecting telescope as a proof for his theory that white light is composed of a spectrum of colours. He had concluded that the lens of any refracting telescope would suffer from the dispersion of light into colours (chromatic aberration). The telescope he constructed used mirrors as the objective which bypass that problem. To create the primary mirror Newton used a custom composition of metal consisting of six parts copper to two parts tin, an early composition of speculum metal. He devised means for shaping and grinding the mirror and may have been the first to use a pitch lap to polish the optical surface. He chose a spherical shape for his mirror instead of a parabola to simplify construction: he had satisfied himself that the chromatic, and not the spherical aberration, formed the chief faults of refracting telescopes. He added to his reflector what is the hallmark of the design of a "Newtonian telescope", a secondary "diagonal" mirror near the primary mirror's focus to reflect the image at 90° angle to an eyepiece mounted on the side of the telescope. This unique addition allowed the image to be viewed with minimal obstruction of the objective mirror. He also made all the tube, mount, and fittings.

Newton described his invention as:

"The diameter of the sphere to which the Metal was ground concave was about 25 English Inches, and by consequence the length of the Instrument about six Inches and a quarter. The Eye-glass was Plano-convex, and the diameter of the Sphere to which the convex side was ground was about 1/5 of an Inch, or a little less, and by consequence it magnified between 30 and 40 times. By another way of measuring I found it magnified 35 times. The concave Metal bore an Aperture of an Inch and a third part, but the Aperture was limited not by an Opake Circle, covering the limb of the Metal round about, but be an opake Circle, placed between the Eyeglass and the Eye, and perforated in the middle with a little round hole for the Rays to pass through to the Eye. For this Circle being placed here, stopp'd much of the erroneous Light, which other wise would have disturbed the Vision. By comparing it with a pretty good Perspective of four Feet in length, made with a concave Eye-glass, I could read at a greater distance with my own Instrument than with the Glass. Yet Objects appeared much darker in it than in the Glass, and that partly because more Light was lost by Reflexion in the Metal, than by Refraction in the Glass, and partly because my Instrument was overcharged. Had it magnified but 30 or 25 times, it would have made the Object appear more brisk and pleasant" ... "The object-metal was two inches broad, and about one-third part of an inch thick, to keep it from bending. I had two of these metals, and when I had polished them both I tried which was best; and ground the other again, to see if I could make it better, than that which I kept."

Newton describes a telescope with an objective concave primary mirror diameter of 2 inches (50 mm) 0.3 of an inch thick, ground to fit a sphere that was 25 inches in diameter giving it a radius of 12.5 inches and a focal length of 6.25 inches (158 mm). The mirror's aperture was reduced to an effective aperture of 1.3 inches by placing a disk with a hole in it between the observer's eye and the eyepiece. The telescope had a flat diagonal secondary mirror bouncing the light at a 90° angle to a Plano-convex eyepiece with a probable focal length of 4.5mm yielding his observed 35 times magnification. Newton said the telescope was 6.25 inches long; this matches the length of the instrument pictured in his monograph "Opticks". It appears that the second telescope, which was presented to the Royal Society has a longer focal length as it is significantly longer than the first one shown in his illustration and described in "Opticks". Newton completed his first reflecting telescope in late 1668 and first wrote about it in a February 23, 1669 letter to Henry Oldenburg (Secretary of the Royal Society).".

Newton found that he could see the four Galilean moons of Jupiter and the crescent phase of the planet Venus with his new little telescope. Newton's friend Isaac Barrow showed the telescope to a small group from the Royal Society of London at the end of 1671. They were so impressed with it they demonstrated it for Charles II in January 1672. This telescope remained in the repository of the Royal Society until it disintegrated and then disappeared from their records. The last reference to it was in 1731 saying that only two mirrors remained of it.

The practical potential of Newton's first telescope was made more clear by the end of the 18th century, when the largest reflector had grown to nearly 50 inches aperture (126 cm) while the largest achromatic lens objective was not more than about 5 inches (13 cm).

There has been some lack of clarity over the early telescopes that Newton built, but it is now clear that his first telescope was a prototype that he constructed in 1668. This was seen only by a few friends at Cambridge and very little is known of it. This prototype had a mirror a little over an inch in diameter, probably 1.3 inches, and around 6 inches in length. Newton seldom referred to this prototype in later years and so his second telescope is often called his first.

Newton's second telescope was made in 1671; it had a mirror of 2 inches diameter and a focal length of between 6.25" and 6.3". He made two mirrors and chose the best one for the telescope. He did not keep this telescope long, but presented it to the Royal Society for examination. An account of this telescope just after its presentation in December 1671 described it as being about 7 inches long and about 2.25 inches in diameter. The image was viewed through a hole in the side of the tube "about the size of a great pins head". The tube was one piece and the mirror was moved up from the bottom in order to focus it. It was mounted on a ball and socket mount. This second telescope stayed with the society and by 1731 it had disintegrated to the point of only the two metal mirrors remaining. It then subsequently disappeared. It is certain that this is not the telescope that the Royal Society now hold in their possession as this mirror contained silver and the third telescope mirror contains no silver but has the addition of arsenic. This was something which Newton proposed as an improvement on his second telescope mirror as he found that the metal was too soft due to the silver.

Newton's third telescope was built in 1671–1672 by Newton and his "chamber fellow" at Trinity College John Wickins. He reported that Wickins did a better job of figuring the mirror than he had done on his second telescope. This is the telescope that he had by him when he was writing Opticks. The telescope appeared some time later in the shop of Heath and Wing instrument makers along with an instrument of Newtons belonging to Edmond Halley. It is most likely that the telescope had passed to Halley and then to Heath and Wing. This third telescope had the mirror damaged in 1694 by Newton while trying to clean it. It is thought that the mirror was later refigured by restorers accounting for its plugged eyepiece hole at an appropriate distance for a 6.25 inch focal length mirror and the new eyepiece position for the current mirror focal length of 8.5 inches. The current brass eyepiece is not original and was added later. This telescope was restored by Heath and Wing and presented to the Royal Society in 1766 as the telescope that Newton had made. At a later date a plaque was added to this telescope with the incorrect inscription claiming that it was his first telescope and made in 1671. This telescope probably includes the original mirrors, reground, part of the original base, the original support bar and possibly the original tube or parts of it.

== Specifications ==
For the 2-inch mirror reflector

- Reflector—custom speculum metal composition
- Optical mirror diameter— 2 inches (50 mm)
- Optical stopped down aperture— 1.3 inches (33 mm)
- Optical focal length—6.25 inches (158 mm)
- Optical effective (stopped down) F-number—f/4.78
- Optical bare mirror F-number—f/3.16
- Optical eyepiece focal length—0.17 inches (4.5 mm)

== Replicas ==
A replica of the 1668 Newton's telescope was made in 1924 by F.L. Agate for the Science Museum, London. Two replicas were made in the 1960s from the original, one for the Queen and another for European Northern Observatory at La Palma. Another replica was made in 1984 for the chief designer of the William Herschel Telescope. The 1984 replica ended up in the collection of the National Maritime Museum by the early 21st century.

== See also ==
- Isaac Newton Telescope, a 2.5m Telescope named for Isaac Newton, completed in 1967
- List of largest optical telescopes in the 18th century
- List of largest optical telescopes in the British Isles
- James Gregory (mathematician) & Gregorian telescope
