= Gregorian telescope =

Type of telescope design (astronomy magnifier)

Diagram of the lightpath through a Gregorian telescope

The Gregorian telescope is a type of reflecting telescope designed by Scottish mathematician and astronomer James Gregory in the 17th century, and first built in 1673 by Robert Hooke. James Gregory was a contemporary of Isaac Newton, and both often worked simultaneously on similar projects. Gregory's design was published in 1663 and pre-dates the first practical reflecting telescope, the Newtonian telescope, built by Sir Isaac Newton in 1668. However, Gregory's design was only a theoretical description, and he never actually constructed the telescope. It was not successfully built until five years after Newton's first reflecting telescope.

== History ==
The Gregorian telescope is named after the James Gregory design, which appeared in his 1663 publication Optica Promota (The Advance of Optics). Similar theoretical designs have been found in the writings of Bonaventura Cavalieri (Lo Specchio Ustorio (On Burning Mirrors), 1632) and Marin Mersenne (L'harmonie universalle, 1636). Gregory's early attempts to build the telescope failed, since he had no practical skill himself and could find no optician capable of actually constructing one. It was not until ten years after Gregory's publication, aided by the interest of experimental scientist Robert Hooke, that a working instrument was created. The early Scottish optician and telescope maker James Short built Gregorian telescopes with parabolic mirrors made from the highly reflective speculum metal.

== Design ==
The Gregorian telescope consists of two concave mirrors: the primary mirror (a concave paraboloid) collects the light and brings it to a focus before the secondary mirror (a concave ellipsoid), where it is reflected back through a hole in the centre of the primary, and thence out the bottom end of the instrument, where it can be viewed with the aid of the eyepiece.

The Gregorian design solved the problem of viewing the image in a reflector by allowing the observer to stand behind the primary mirror. This design of telescope renders an erect image, making it useful for terrestrial observations. It also works as a telephoto lens with its tube much shorter than the system's actual focal length.

The design was largely superseded by the Cassegrain telescope as equivalent focal length is greater than the physical focal length which provides better illumination uniformity. It is still used for some spotting scopes because this design creates an erect image without the need for prisms. The Steward Observatory Mirror Lab has been making mirrors for large Gregorian telescopes at least since 1985.

In the Gregorian design, the primary mirror creates a real image before the secondary mirror. This allows for a field stop to be placed at this location, so that the light from outside the field of view does not reach the secondary mirror. This is a major advantage for solar telescopes, where a field stop (Gregorian stop) can reduce the amount of heat reaching the secondary mirror and subsequent optical components. The Solar Optical Telescope on the Hinode satellite is one example of this design.

For amateur telescope makers the Gregorian can be less difficult to fabricate than a Cassegrain because the concave secondary is Foucault-testable like the primary, which is not the case with the Cassegrain's convex secondary.

== Gallery ==
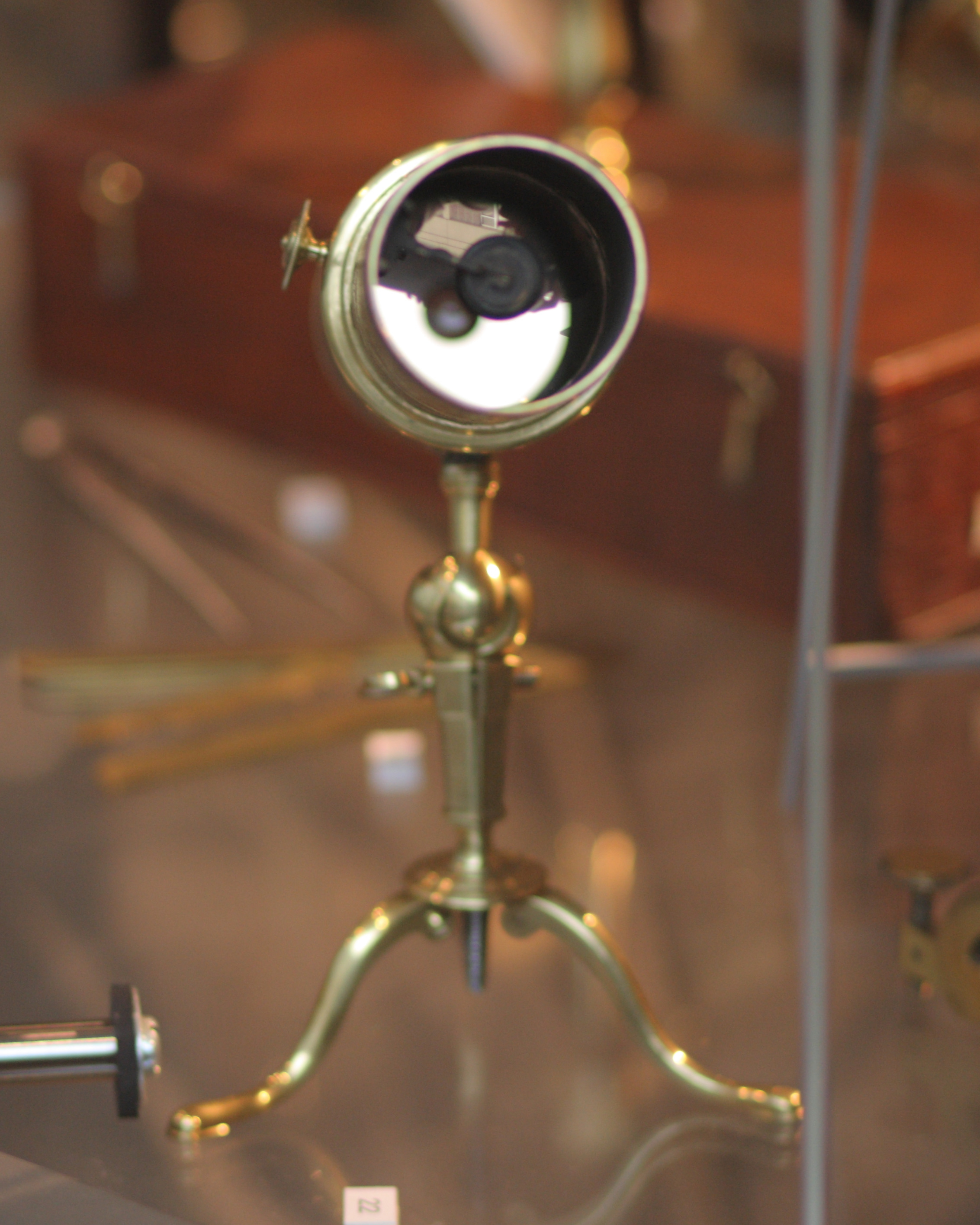
A Gregorian telescope circa 1735

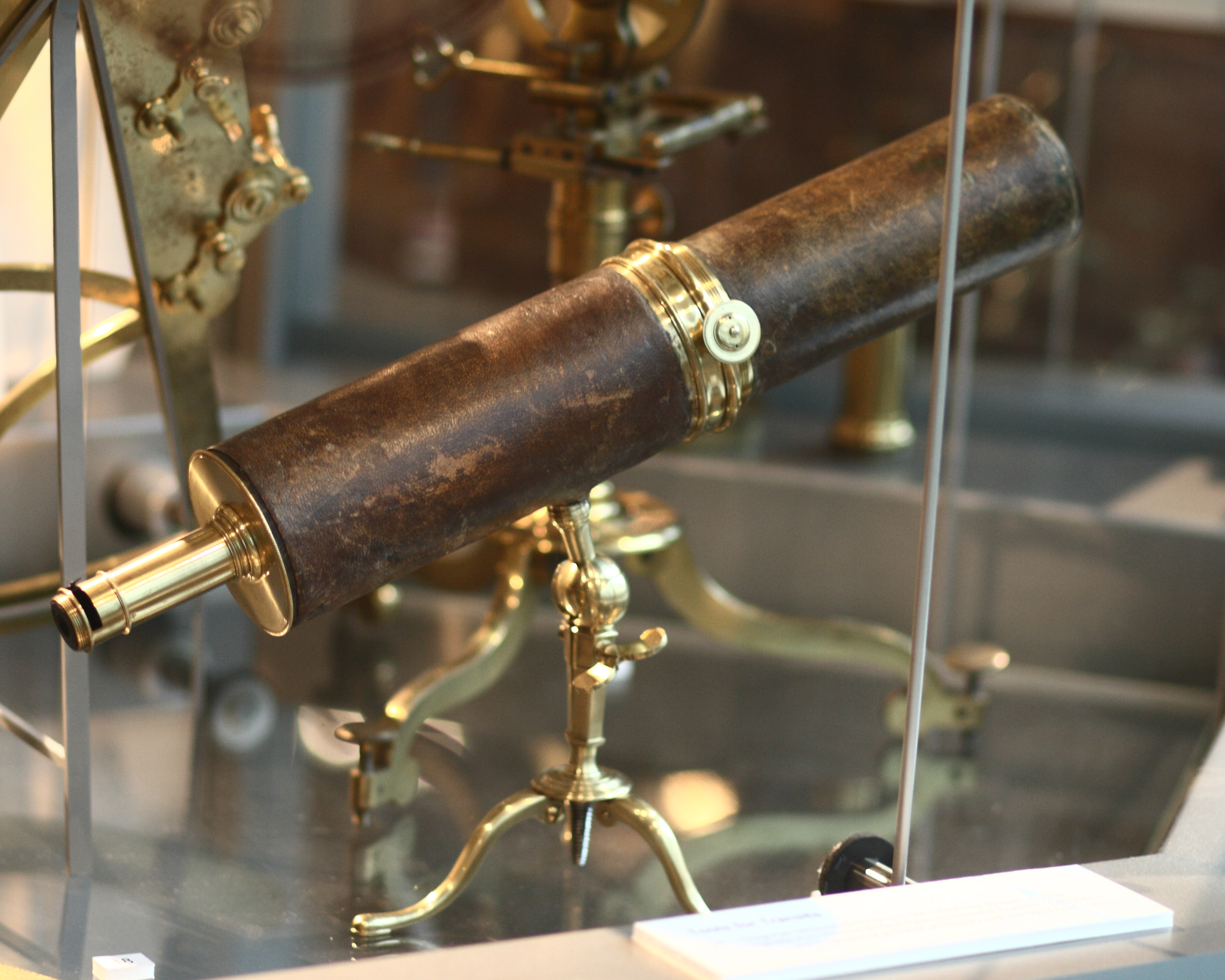
Side view

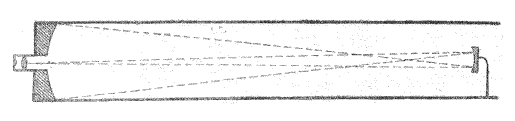
1873 diagram of a Gregorian telescope

== Examples ==
- The MeerKAT, the Green Bank Telescope, the Arecibo Observatory, and the Allen Telescope Array are all radio telescopes employing off-axis Gregorian optics.
- The Vatican Advanced Technology Telescope, the Magellan telescopes, and the Large Binocular Telescope use Gregorian optics.
- The Giant Magellan Telescope will also use Gregorian optics.
- The NSF's Daniel K. Inouye Solar Telescope

== See also ==
- List of telescope types
- Giant Magellan Telescope
- Gregor telescope at the Teide Observatory.
- James Gregory Telescope at the university of St. Andrews
- Large Binocular Telescope
- James Short (mathematician)
