= List of largest optical telescopes in the 19th century =

This list of largest optical telescopes in the 19th century includes what were large optical telescopes for their time. See List of largest optical telescopes in the 20th century for later telescopes. The list includes various refractors and reflectors that were active at some time between about 1799 to 1901.

The main material used early on for reflecting telescope mirrors was speculum metal, which reflected only about two-thirds of the incident light, and which tarnished, requiring maintenance. Two-element refracting telescopes were extensively used in 19th century observatories despite their smaller apertures than metal, and later glass, mirror telescopes.

The technology for silver-coating glass mirrors, more reflective than speculum metal and not subject to tarnishing, was developed in the mid-19th century but was slow to be adopted. A major technology advance of this time was the development of photography, permitting astrophotography, and some telescopes were tailored to this application. A wide variety of scientific instruments were developed for use with telescopes, such as for spectroscopy and various astronomical measurements.

== Reflectors and refractors ==
Early reflectors using speculum metal had some of the record-breaking apertures of the day, but not necessarily high performance. Starting in the 1860s metal coated glass ('Silver on glass') reflector telescopes proved more durable, for example the Crossley Reflector, which continued to be used and upgraded even into the 21st century. Refracting telescopes, with lenses, especially achromatic doublets, rather than mirrors were popular in the 19th century (see also great refractor).

Legend
- Reflector (Metal mirror) or unknown
- Glass Reflector (Silver on glass mirror)
- Refractor (Lens)

Name/Observatory	Aperture cm (in)	Type	Location then (Original Site)	Extant*
Leviathan of Parsonstown	183 cm (72 in)	reflector – metal	Birr Castle; Ireland	1845–1908?
A.A. Common 60-inch	152.4 cm (60.0 in)	reflector – glass	England, UK	1891–1904
Herschel 40-foot (1.26 m diam.)	126 cm (49 1/2 in)	reflector – metal	Observatory House; England, UK	1789–1815
Great Paris Exhibition Telescope of 1900	125 cm (49 in)	achromat – siderostat	Paris 1900 Exposition, France	1900–1901
Great Melbourne Telescope	122 cm (48 in)	reflector – metal	Melbourne Observatory, Australia	1869
William Lassell 48-inch	122 cm (48 in)	reflector – metal	Malta	1861–1865
National Observatory, Paris	1.2 m (47 in)	reflector-glass	Paris, France	1875–1943
Yerkes Observatory	102 cm (40 in)	achromat	Williams Bay, Wisconsin, USA	1897
Meudon Observatory 100 cm	100 cm (39 in)	reflector-glass	Meudon Observatory, France	1891
James Lick telescope, Lick Observatory	91 cm (36 in)	achromat	Mount Hamilton, California, USA	1888
Crossley Reflector	91.4 cm (36.0 in)	reflector – glass	Lick Observatory, USA	1896
A. A. Common Reflector	91.4 cm (36.0 in)	reflector – glass	Great Britain	1880–1896
Rosse 36-inch Telescope (The 3-foot)	91.4 cm (36.0 in)	reflector – metal	Birr Castle; Ireland	1826
Grande Lunette, Paris Observatory	83 cm + 62 cm (32.67 in + 24.40 in)	achromat x2	Meudon, France	1891
83-cm Reflector, Toulouse Observatory	83 cm (33 in)	reflector-glass	Toulouse, France	1875
Potsdam Großer Refraktor; Astrophysical Observatory Potsdam	80 cm + 50 cm (31½ in + 29½ in)	achromat x2	Potsdam, Deutsches Kaiserreich	1899
Foucault 80 cm, Marseille Observatory	80 cm (31 in)	reflector-glass	Marseille, France	1862–1965
Grand Lunette Bischoffsheim, Nice Observatory	77 cm (30 in)	achromat	Nice, France	1886
Pulkovo observatory	76 cm (30 in)	achromat	Saint Petersburg, Russian Empire	1885–1941/44
Royal Observatory, Greenwich	76.2 cm (30.0 in)	reflector	Greenwich, England, UK	1897
28-inch Grubb Refractor – Royal Greenwich Observatory	71 cm (28 in)	achromat	Greenwich, London, Great Britain	1894
Henry Draper 28-inch (Harvard College Observatory since 1889)	71 cm (28 in)	reflector-glass	United States	1871
Großer Refraktor, Vienna Observatory	69 cm (27 in)	achromat	Vienna, Austrian Empire	1880
Great Treptow Refractor, Treptow Observatory	68 cm (27 in)	achromat	Berlin, Germany	1896
McCormick Observatory	67 cm (26 in)	achromat	Charlottesville, Virginia, USA	1883
U.S. Naval Observatory	66 cm (26 in)	achromat	Washington, DC, USA	1873
Royal Greenwich Observatory	66 cm (26 in)	achromat	Herstmonceux, Great Britain	1896
Newall Telescope	62.5 cm (24.6 in)	refractor	Gateshead, England, UK	1869
Lowell Observatory	61 cm (24 in)	achromat	Arizona, USA	1896
Craig telescope	61 cm (24 in)	achromat	Wandsworth Common, London, UK	1852–1857
William Lassell 24-inch	61 cm (24 in)	reflector – metal	Liverpool, England, UK	1845
Royal Observatory, Edinburgh	61 cm (24 in)	reflector	Edinburgh, Scotland, UK	1872
Daramona 24-inch reflector	61 cm (24 in)	reflector – glass	Streete, Ireland	1881–1971
Radcliffe Double Refractor, Radcliffe Observatory	60/45 cm (23.6″/18")	achromat x2	Oxford, UK	1901
Halstead Observatory	58.4 cm (23.0 in)	achromat	Princeton, New Jersey, USA	1881
Institut technomatique	52 cm (20 1/2 in)	refractor	Paris, France	1857
Chamberlin Observatory	50 cm (20 in)	achromat	Colorado, USA	1891
Nasymth 20-inch	50 cm (20 in)	reflector – metal	United Kingdom	1842
Imperial Observatory (Straßburg)	48.5 cm (19.1 in)	achromat	Straßburg/Strasbourg, German Empire/France	1880
Herschel 20-foot (6.1 m) diam.)	47.5 cm (18 1/2 in)	reflector – metal	Observatory House; England, UK	1782–?
Schröter 27-foot Newtonian	47 cm (18 1/2 in)	reflector – metal	Lilienthal, Lower Saxony (Germany)	1793–1813?
18½-inch Dearborn Observatory Refractor	47 cm (18 1/2 in)	achromat	Chicago (1862–1893), Evanston, Illinois (1893), USA	1862
Flower Observatory	46 cm (18 in)	achromat	Philadelphia, USA	1896
Royal Observatory	46 cm (18 in)	achromat	Cape Colony, South Africa, British Empire	1897
Merz & Mahler Refractor, Pulkovo observatory	38 cm (15 in)	achromat	Saint Petersburg, Russian Empire	1839
Harvard Great Refractor, Harvard College Observatory	38 cm (15 in)	achromat	Cambridge, Massachusetts, USA	1847
Armagh 15-inch Grubb Reflector	38 cm (15 in)	reflector – metal	Armagh Observatory, Northern Ireland	1835
Paris Observatory (Arago Telescope) 38 cm Brunner	38 cm (15 in)	achromat	Paris, France	1857
Lunette coudée, Lyon Observatory	36.6 cm	achromat	Saint-Genis-Laval, France	1887
Markree Observatory 13.3-inch Grubb/Cauchoix	34 cm (13 in)	refractor	County Sligo, United Kingdom of Great Britain and Ireland	1834
The 12.8 Inch Merz refractor at Royal Greenwich Observatory	32.5 cm (12.8 in)	refractor	Greenwich, England	1850s
McMillin Observatory 12½-inch	31.75 cm (12 1/2 in)	refractor	Ohio, USA	1895; 1896–1968
Bamberg Refractor, Wilhelm Foerster Observatory (since 1963) in Berlin	31.4 cm (12.4 in)	achromat	Urania Observatory, Berlin-Moabit, Prussia / Berlin, Germany	1889–1945
Grubb refractor, Keele Observatory	31 cm (12 in)	achromat	Oxford, England, UK	1874
University of Illinois Observatory	30 cm (12 in)	achromat	Urbana, Illinois, USA	1896
Great refractor of Amici (Amici I), Florence Observatory La Specola	28.4 cm (11.2 in)	achromat	Florence, Italy	1841
Merz und Mahler (Mitchell cupola), Cincinnati Observatory	28 cm (11 in)	achromat	Cincinnati, Ohio, USA	1843
Repsold Refractor (10-duims), Leiden Observatory	26.6 cm (10 1/2 in)	achromat	Leiden, The Netherlands	1885
Mills Observatory	25 cm (9.8 in)	achromat	United Kingdom	1871
Fraunhofer Refractor, United States Naval Observatory (Foggy Bottom)	24.4 cm (9.6 in)	achromat	Foggy Bottom, D.C., USA	1844
Quito Astronomical Observatory	24 cm (9 1/2 in)	Great refractor	Quito, Ecuador	1875
Fraunhofer-Refraktor, Berlin Observatory	24 cm (9.4 in)	achromat	Berlin-Kreuzberg, Deutsches Kaiserreich (1835–1913)	1835
Great Dorpat Refractor (Fraunhofer) Dorpat/Tartu Observatory	24 cm (9.4 in)	achromat	Dorpat, Governorate of Livonia, Russian Empire / now Tartu, Estonia	1824
Van Monckhoven Telescope	23 cm	refractor	Ghent, Belgium, UGENT Observatory Armand Pien	1880
Sheepshanks Equatorial of Royal Greenwich Observatory	17 cm (6.7 in)	achromat	Greenwich, England, UK	1838
Merz Refractor (6-duims), Leiden Observatory	16.6 cm (6 1/2 in)	achromat	Leiden, The Netherlands	1838
Wesleyan University 6-inch Lerebours refractor	15.24 cm (6.00 in)	achromat	Connecticut, USA	1836
Shuckburgh telescope	10 cm (3.9 in)	achromat	Warwickshire, England, UK	1791–1923
Utzschneider & Fraunhofer Comet Seeker	10.2 cm (4.0 in)	acrhomat	Foggy Bottom, D.C., USA	1843
Ertel Comet Seeker; Markree Observatory	7.62 (3 in)	achromat	Markree, Ireland	1842–1873

* (First light or Build Completion to Inactive (Retired) or Deconstruction)

== See also ==
- Lists of telescopes
- List of largest optical telescopes in the 20th century
- List of largest optical telescopes in the 18th century
- List of largest optical reflecting telescopes
- List of minor planets: 1–1000 (Over 450 Minor planets were discovered in the 19th century)
