= Greenwich 28-inch refractor =

Telescope at the Royal Observatory, Greenwich, England

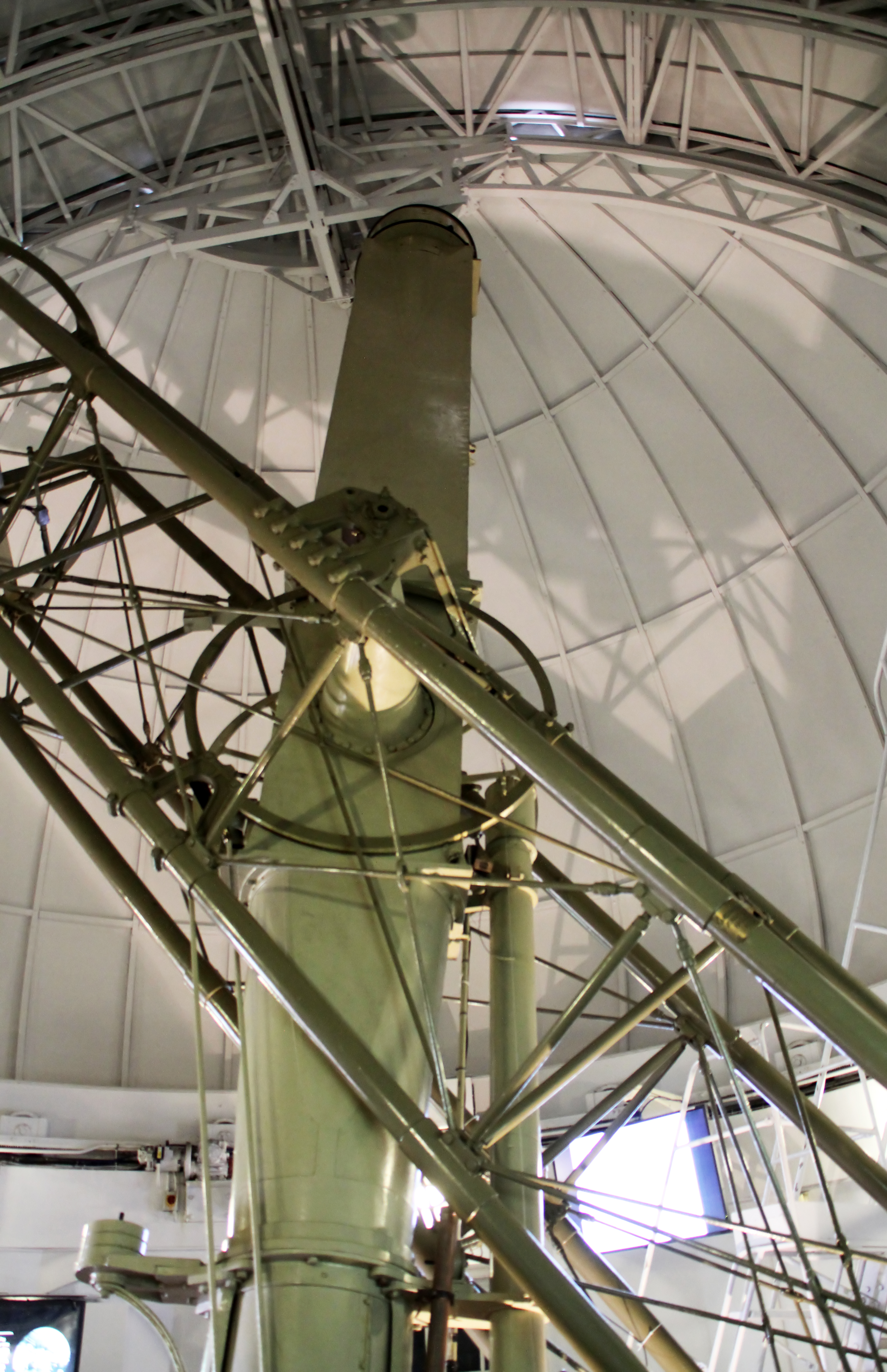
- Royal Observatory, Greenwich's 28-inch Great refractor
- Location: Royal Observatory Former Great Equatorial Building, Royal Borough of Greenwich, Greater London, London, England
- Coordinates: 51°28′40″N 0°00′04″W
- Diameter: 28 in (0.71 m)
- Location within the United Kingdom
- Related media on Commons

The Greenwich 28-inch refractor is a telescope at the Royal Observatory, Greenwich, where it was first installed in 1893. It is a 28-inch ( 71 cm) aperture objective lens telescope, otherwise known as a refractor, and was made by the telescope maker Sir Howard Grubb. The achromatic lens was made Grubb from Chance Brothers glass. The mounting is older however and dates to the 1850s, having been designed by Royal Observatory director George Airy and the firm Ransomes and Simms. The telescope is noted for its spherical dome which extends beyond the tower, nicknamed the "onion" dome. Another name for this telescope is "The Great Equatorial" which it shares with the building, which housed an older but smaller telescope previously.

The telescope was re-commissioned by Queen Elizabeth II in May 1975 after it was brought back from Herstmonceux in Sussex. It was placed in the renovated original dome at Greenwich for the tricentennial celebration of the observatory.

== History ==
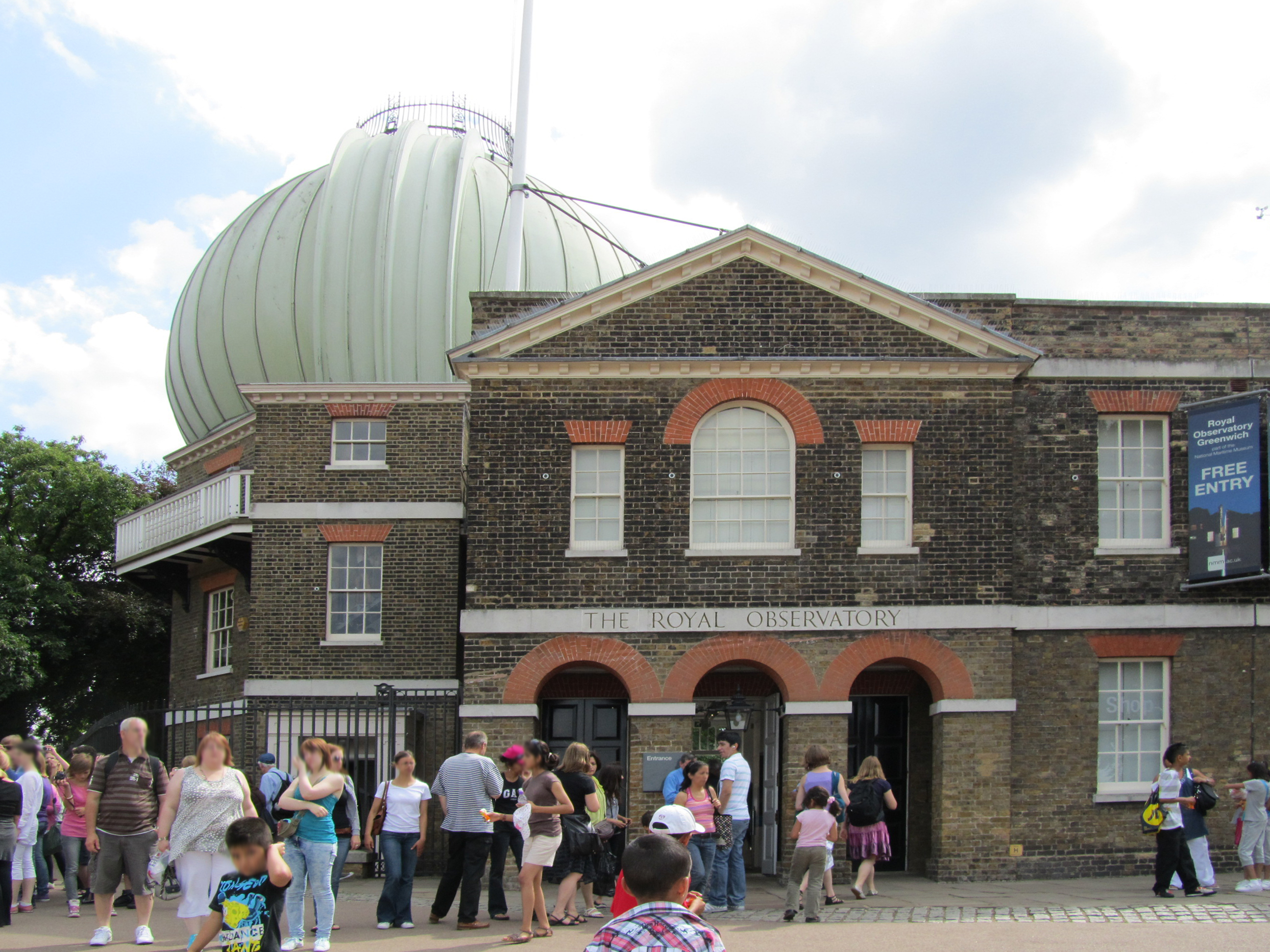
The observatory is popular for tourism in modern times.

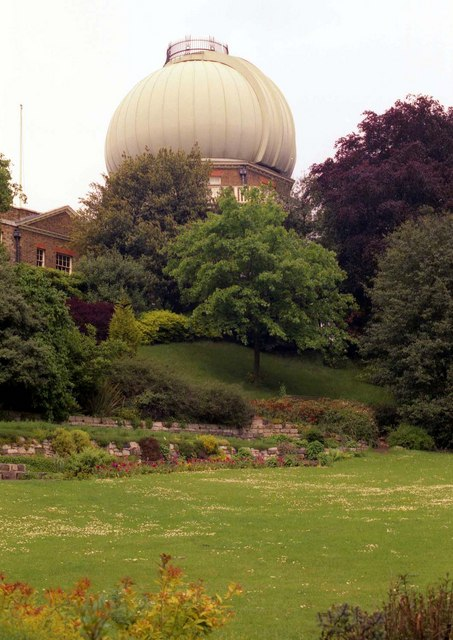
From the other side.

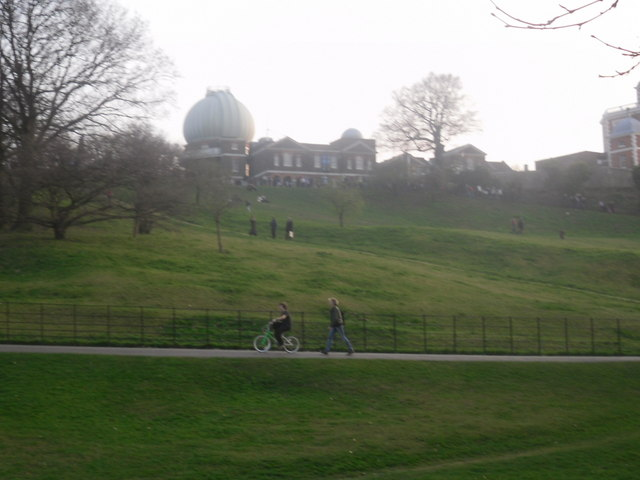
The observatory sits amidst Greenwich Park in London, England.

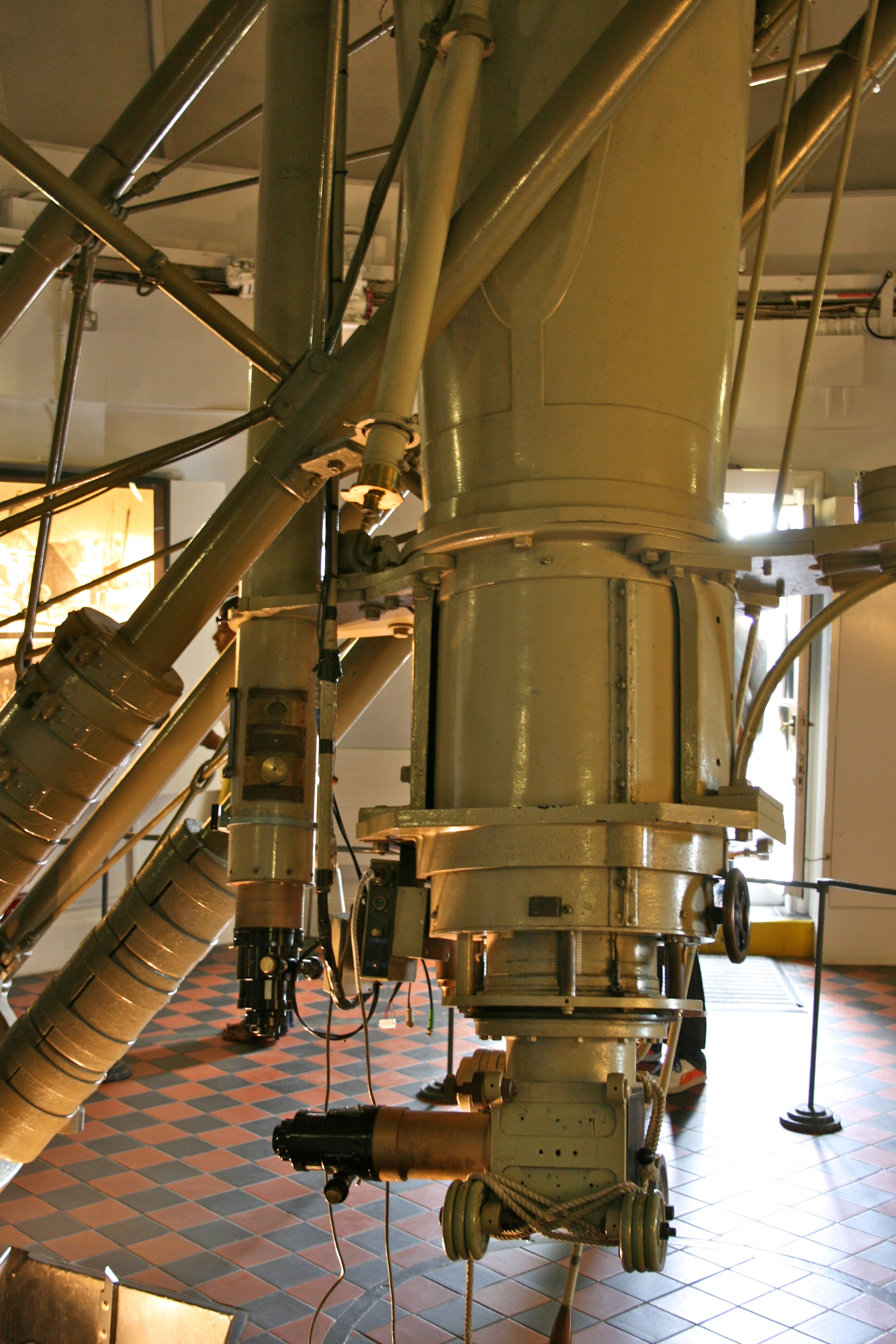
The observer's end of the telescope, showing various eyepieces.

A 28-inch aperture refractor was ordered from the telescope maker Grubb in 1885. It was installed by 1893 in the Great Equatorial building.

The 28-inch telescope was installed on the same mounting as an older 12.8 inch aperture refractor at the same location. The 12.8 inch was moved to be a guide telescope for the Thompson 26-inch refractor. The mounting dates to the 1850s. The mounting is an English equatorial mount built by Ransomes and Sims, and Williams Sims.

The dome's overall design dates to 1892 but the current dome is made of fibreglass and dates to 1971, after the original made of iron and papier-mâché was in need of refurbishment when the telescope was moved back to Greenwich in the 1970s.

The telescope is reported to have a resolving power of 0.16 arcseconds. The telescope's objective lens was removed during the Second World War for safekeeping, and then put back after that conflict was over.

The 28-inch was moved to Herstmonceux in 1947, and operated there between 1957 and 1970, but was moved back to Greenwich in 1971. The return of the 28-inch refractor in 1971 to the Greenwich Observatory site was featured in an episode of the British television show The Sky at Night.

One reason for this was to have it ready for the tricentennial of Greenwich Observatory in 1975. The telescope was recommissioned by Queen Elizabeth II in May 1975 after it was brought back from Herstmonceux. Since that time it has been under care of the National Maritime Museum, where it is noted as one of the most popular exhibits. The original site dates to King Charles II's commissioning of John Flamsteed to be an astronomical observer on March 4, 1675; by the summer of 1676 Flamsteed operated from the new Flamsteed House on Greenwich hill.

The telescope is known as the largest aperture refractor in the United Kingdom, and is a popular tourist attraction. The telescope now features in observing events in the 21st century. In the 1980s it was noted that there was an admission charge for visitors to look through the 28-inch.

The guide telescope for the 28-inch Grubb as of the 1890s was the Corbett telescope with 6.5 inch aperture refractor. The 6.5 inch aperture Corbett telescope had also been used as a guide scope on the Lassell reflecting telescope in the 1880s. The 6.5 inch telescope was originally purchased used from a Mr Corbett, and was on a mobile tripod; it was acquired as an expedition telescope for the 1874 Transit of Venus.

In the early 21st century the telescope was normally free to visit, and could reached by going through a gift shop at the observatory when the facilities were open. However, it was also featured in an edutainment presentation called Great Equatorial Encounter and that experience cost the price of few pounds' currency. In the presentation there was multimedia and questions could be asked of a presenter.

== Mounting ==
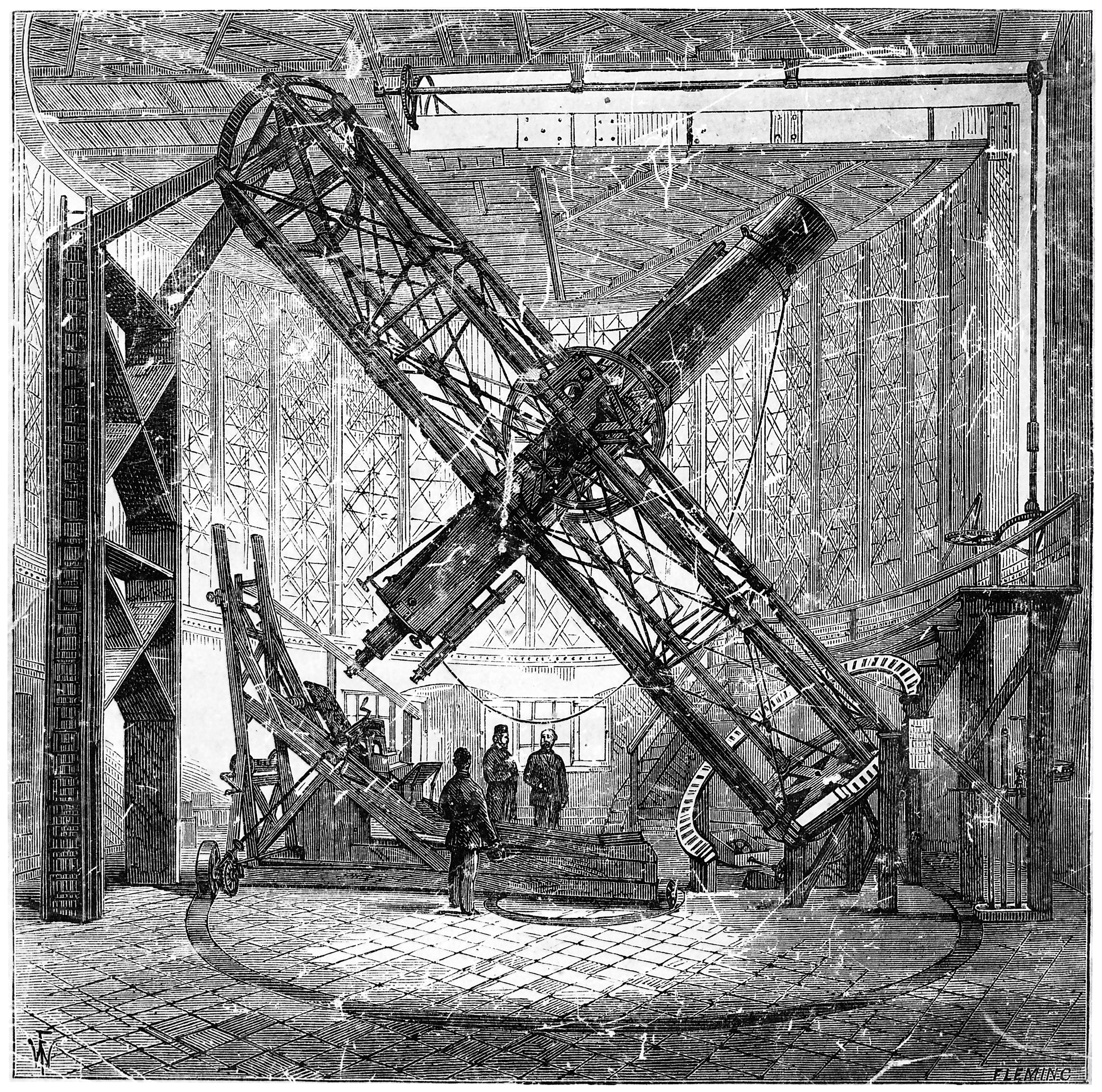
Illustration of the older telescope; the 28-inch used the same mount. However, it needed a new dome due to being longer

The mounting was designed by George Airy in the 1850s, for the older 13-inch refractor, in conjunction with the firm Ransomes and Simms. It is an equatorial design, that allows the telescope to rotate to compensate for the rotation of the Earth; this allows the telescope to stay fixed on certain point in the heavens. The telescope tube is mounted in a latticework of iron, that is mounted on each end on spindle that rest on a stone and metal pier.

In the 1890s the mount was able to accommodate the 28-inch, and was thus re-used.

Originally it was rotated by a clockwork drive powered by water, and later in the 20th century this was replaced by electric motor driven system. In 1897 it was said that the clockwork water drive that "the water clock in general drives it with great precision."

== Domes ==
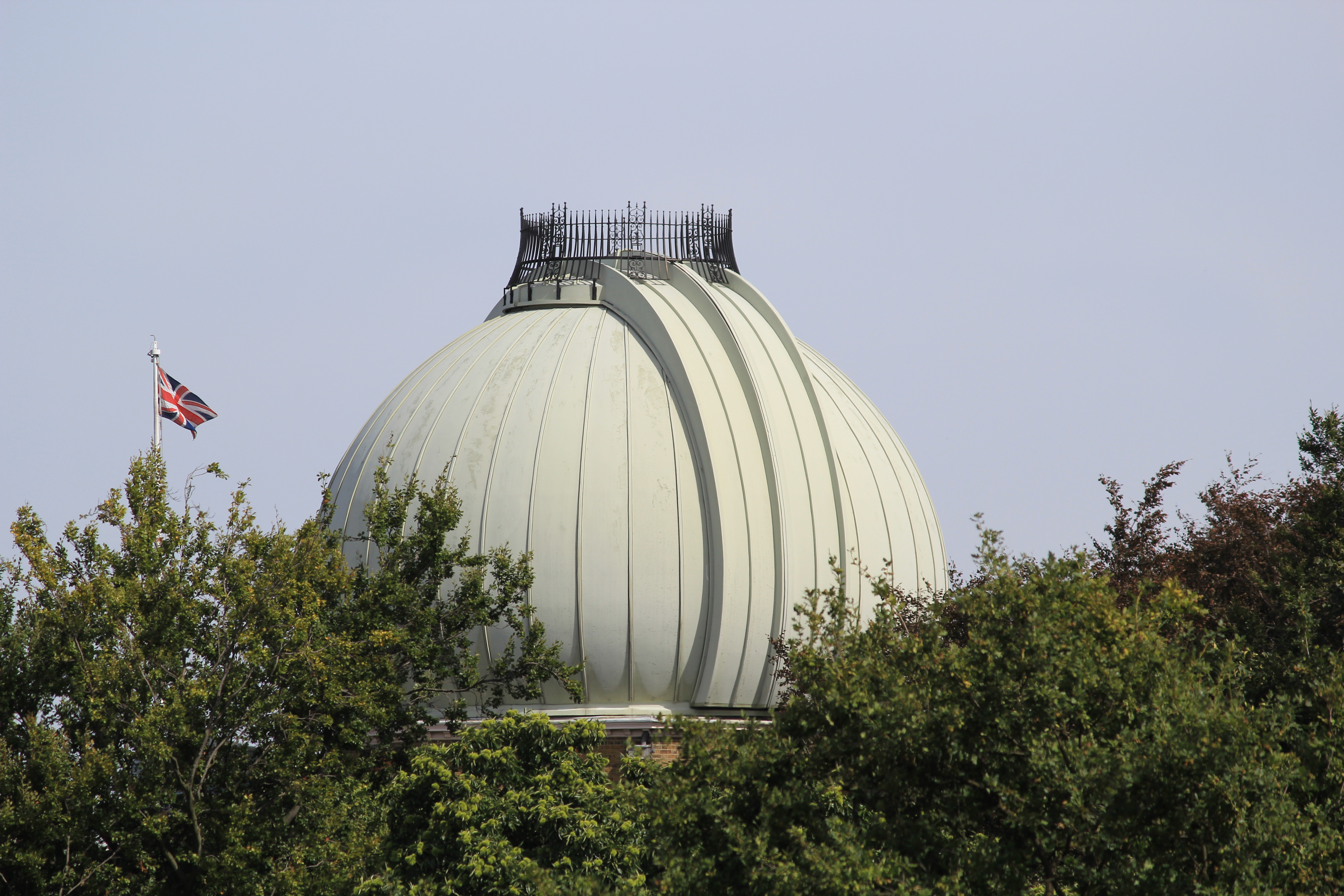
The Great Refractor dome, 2013

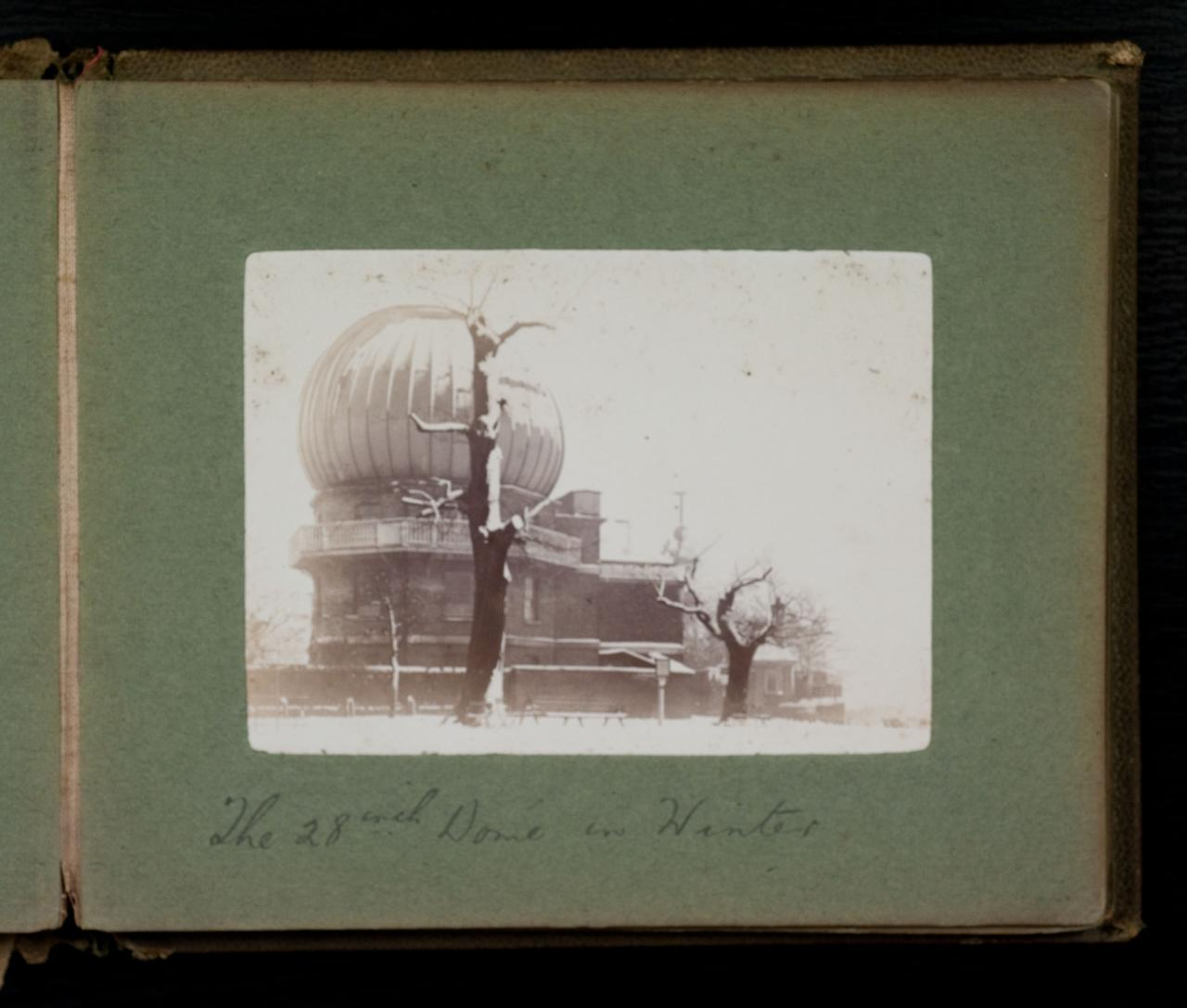
Dome of the Royal Observatory Greenwich 28-inch refractor, circa 1900

The dome for the older, smaller telescope was taken down in 1892, and the new, larger dome for the 28-inch was finished by 1893. The older dome for the 12.8 inch refractor has been called a 'drum dome' whereas the 28-inch is called the 'onion dome'.

The original 1893 dome was made by Messrs T. Cooke and Sons.

The new dome was needed because the 28-inch Grubb was longer than the 12.8 inch aperture Merz. The Grubb has a focal length of 27 feet and 10 inches, while the old Merz had a focal length of 17 feet and 10 inches. The tower diameter is smaller than the length of the new Grubb telescope, so the dome had to be bigger to accommodate its length.

With refractors of this type, the focal length meant a real physical length between the objective and the focus point. Reflecting telescopes can 'fold' their focal length by using mirrors, so they can have a physical length shorter than their optical focal length. Two important figures for telescopes are the aperture and focal length, which affect the equations that describe their properties of magnification.

The dome for the 28-inch is noted for being called the "onion dome" and the original manufacture from 1893 was made of an iron grid and papier-mâché. This dome was damaged in a V-1 flying bomb strike during the Second World War, and was taken down in 1953.

When the telescope was moved back to Greenwich in 1971, a new dome made of fibreglass in the style of the older dome was installed.

The telescope is installed in the 'Great Equatorial Building' at Greenwich. When it was installed at Herstmonceux, the 28-inch Grubb was installed in Dome F. The whole observatory was moved in the 1950s to a new installation at Herstmonceux in Sussex, however, astronomy was changing rapidly at the time with a major focus on observatory location; astronomers could review data from instruments elsewhere.

In 1987 a second staircase into the dome was added, to ease the flow of visitors in and out, the quantity of which was enough to make foot traffic on a single winding staircase difficult. The entrance door to the telescope is also noted for being made of iron, in the Victorian style.

== Observations ==
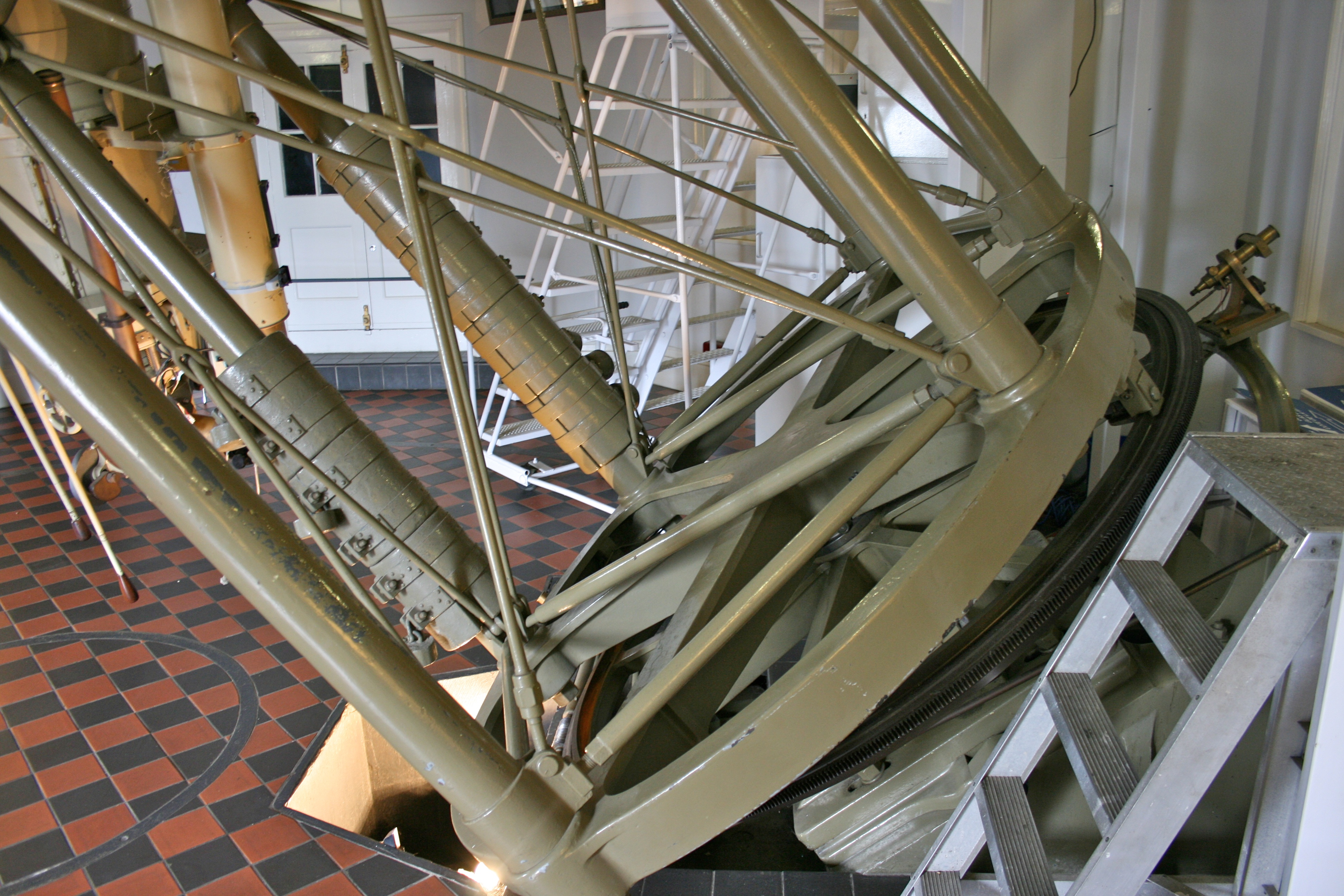
The lower end of the equatorial framework that the telescope tube is held in

An 1897 report on the telescope remarked, "The 28-inch Refractor has been in use throughout the year and is quite satisfactory."

In the 1890s the telescope was used to take measurements of various stars, the diameter of the planet Jupiter, measurements of the location of the Moons of Mars, the 5th satellite of Jupiter, and various measurements of the planet Saturn and its satellites. The fifth satellite of Jupiter was just discovered in 1892, and was later named Amalthea (so at that time there were only 5 moons known including the Galilean moons).

An example of observations taken with the 28-inch was a survey of stars in 1912, measured with a bifilar position micrometer.

In March 1918 the 28 inch took observations of Encke's Comet (1917c). This periodic comet orbits the Sun about every 3.3 years, so in addition to 1918, it also approached the Sun in 1913-4 and again in 1921–22.

An observer of Encke's in March 1918 had this to say of the comet on March 12, 1918, comparing to the early March 9, 1918 observation: "The comet much sharper, brighter, smaller; its diameter was 1 1/2', magnitude 7^{.}7 (B.D. scale). Its magnitude in the 6-inch Corbett was almost stellar, but in the 28 inch no definitive nucleus could be seen."

In the early 1900s the 28-inch was used to measure the diameter of the planet Jupiter using a filar micrometer, and also a double-image micrometer.

Between 1960 and 1963 over 1300 observations of 233 double stars were conducted with the filar micrometer from Herstmonceux with the 28 inch.

== Interior ==
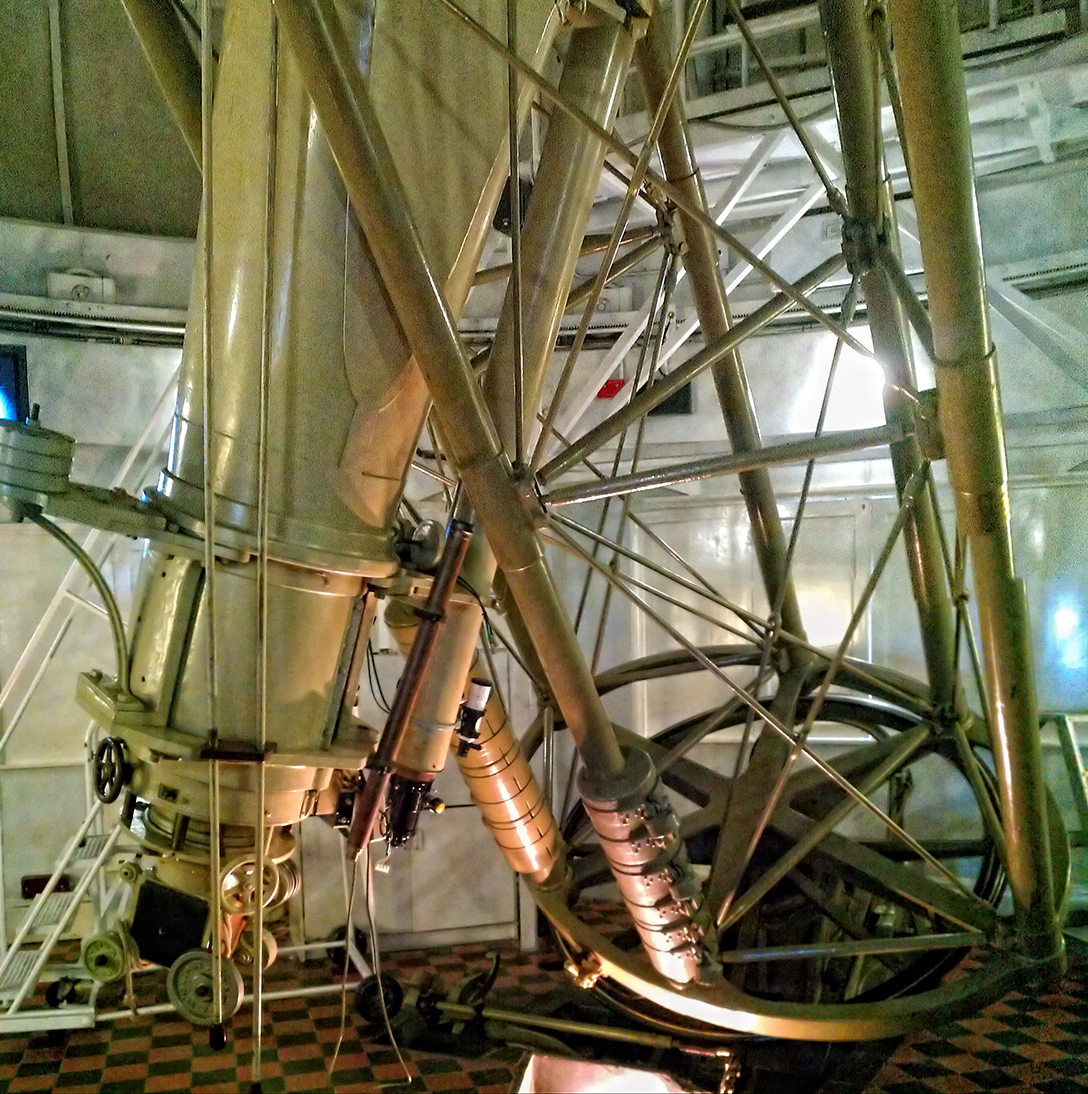
Closeup of lower end of telescope

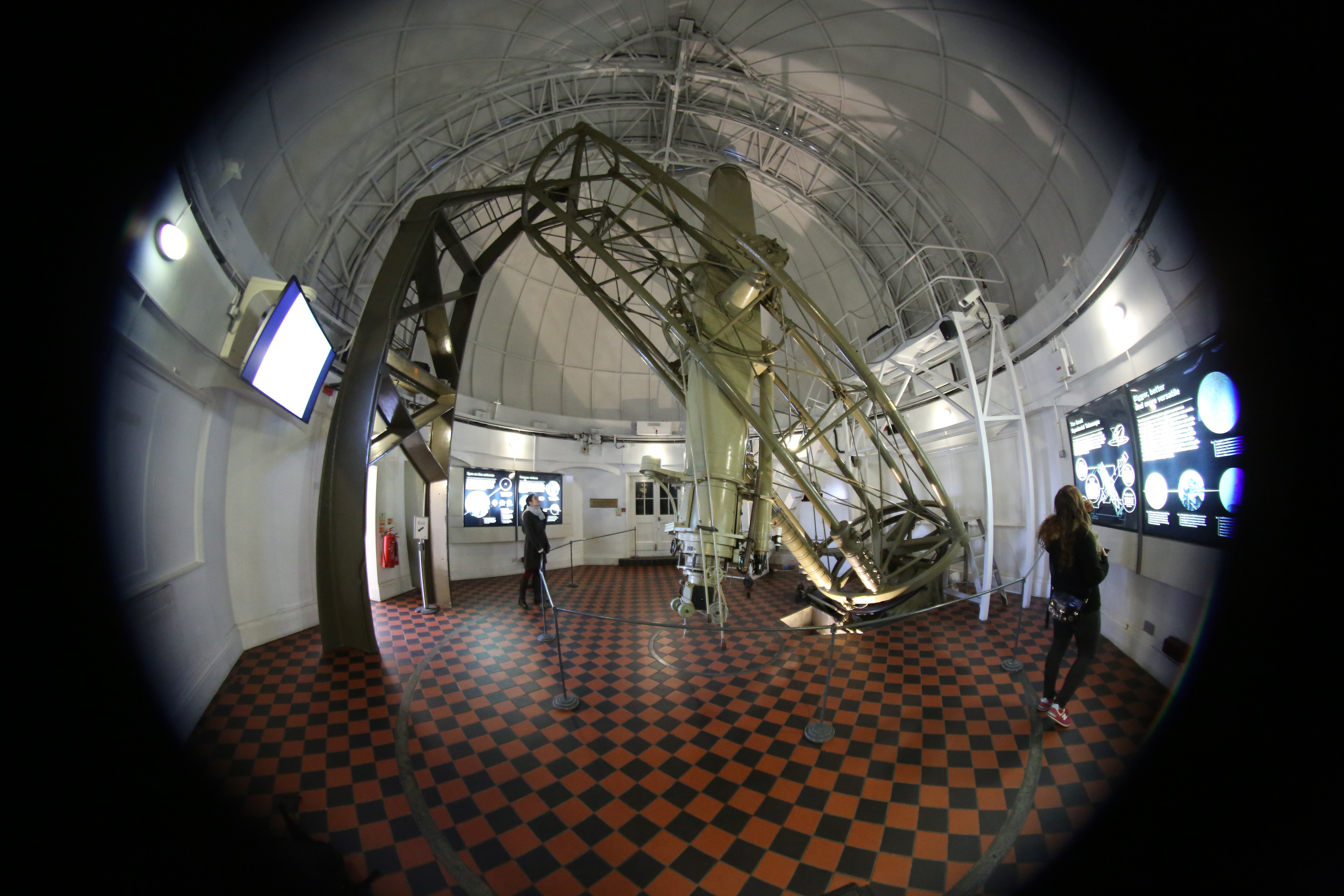
Fisheye panorma of interior

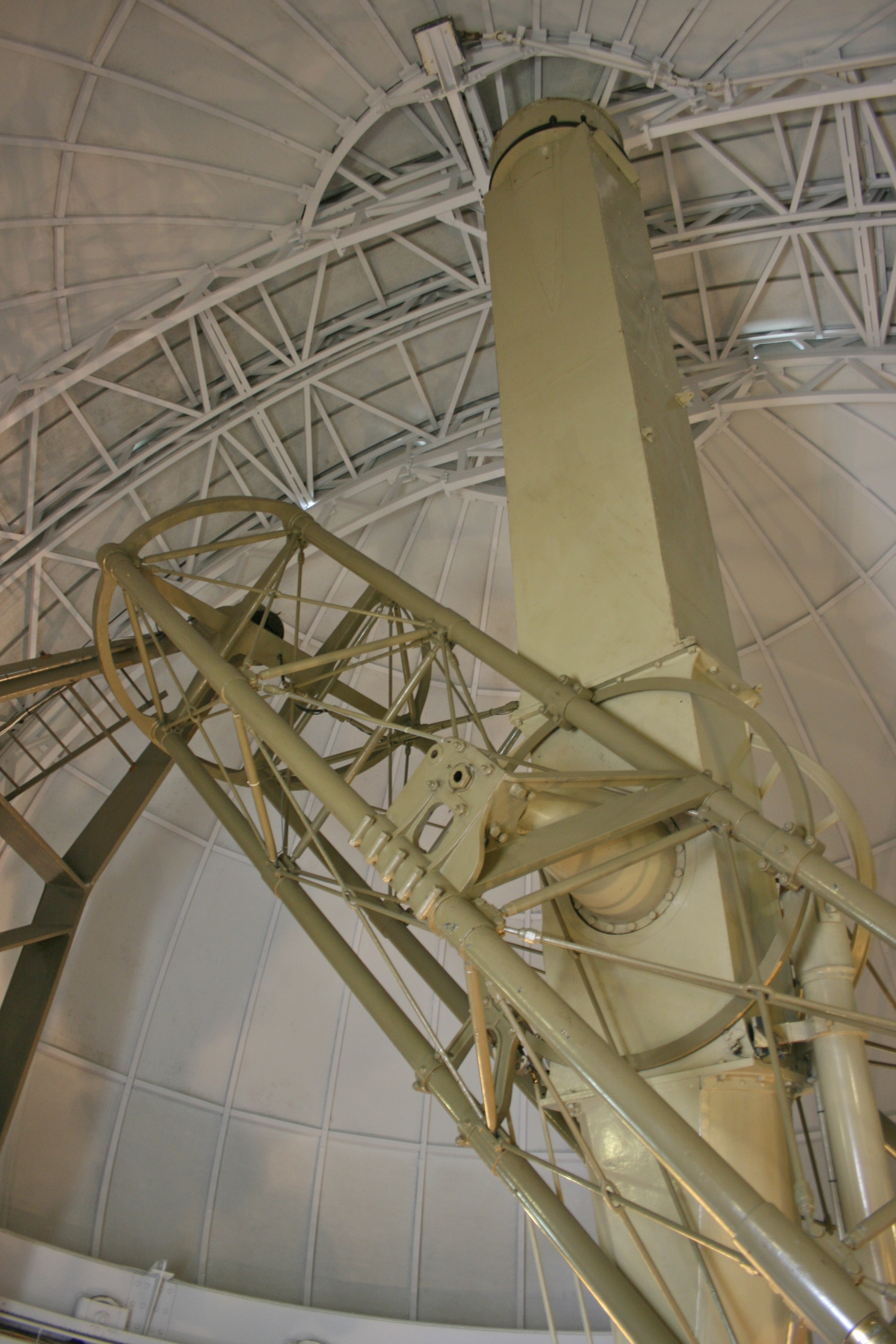
The dome ceiling and the top of the telescope

== See also ==
- Sheepshanks equatorial (Since 1838)
- List of largest optical refracting telescopes
- List of largest optical telescopes in the 19th century
- List of largest optical telescopes in the British Isles
