= Robert-Aglaé Cauchoix =

French scientific instrument and telescope maker

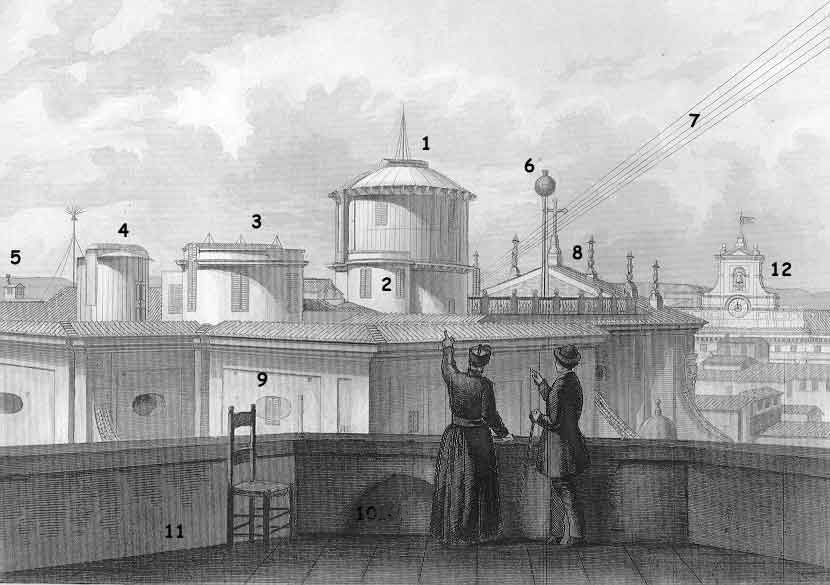
Observatory of the Collegio Romano in 1852. Number 4 indicates the part of the building that accommodated a telescope by Cauchoix.

Robert-Aglaé Cauchoix (24 April 1776 – 5 February 1845) was a French optician and instrument maker, whose lenses played a part in the race of the great refractor telescopes in the first half of the 19th century.

== Instruments ==
At first Cauchoix produced a wide range of scientific instruments including barometers and micrometers, but he soon specialized in optics, making spherometers and objectives. He made a telescope for the Paris Observatory in 1820 and in 1825 he made a 6.5 inch (16.5 cm) refractor for the observatory of the Collegio Romano, a Jesuit academy in Rome. In the Royal Observatory, Greenwich an 1838 instrument named the Sheepshanks telescope includes an objective by Cauchoix. The Sheepshanks had a 6.7 inch (17 cm) wide lens, and was the biggest telescope at Greenwich for about twenty years.

An 1840 report from the Observatory noted of the then-new Sheepshanks telescope with the Cauchoix doublet:

The power and general goodness of this telescope make it a most welcome addition to the instruments of the observatory

== Great refractors ==
Although the reflector telescope was invented in the second half of the 18th century, technological difficulties made the refractor the telescope of choice until the mid-1850s. Improvements in lens production, like the introduction of the achromatic lens by John Dollond, spawned an aperture size race that started in the early 1820s with a telescope made by the German optician Joseph von Fraunhofer. Cauchoix must be credited holding the lens size record three times this period. In 1831, Cauchoix made a 13.3 inch (almost 33.8 cm) refractor for the Irishman Edward Joshua Cooper, who used it to observe Halley's Comet in 1835 and a solar eclipse in 1836.

In 1829, Cauchoix made an 11.75 inch lens for a French customer, but sold it to the British astronomer James South. South used it for his new telescope, which he found defective due to problems with the equatorial mount. In 1838, this telescope was dismantled, but the lens by Cauchoix served in other instruments until 1989.

== See also ==
- List of astronomical instrument makers
