= James Lick telescope =

Telescope in California, United States

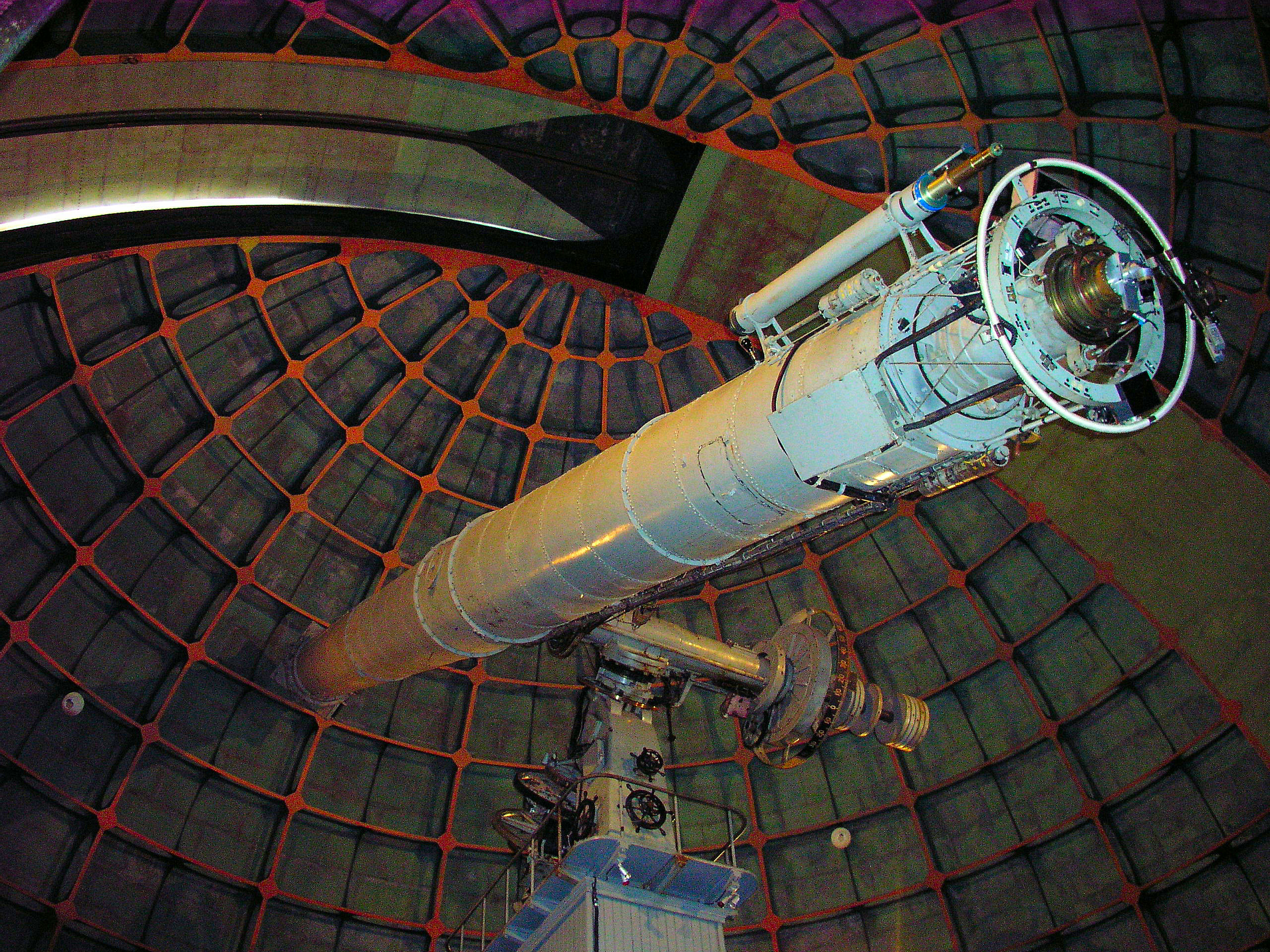
- The James Lick telescope
- Named after: James Lick
- Part of: Lick Observatory
- Location(s): Lick Observatory Main Building, Santa Clara County, California, Pacific States Region
- Coordinates: 37°20′28″N 121°38′35″W
- Altitude: 4,200 ft (1,300 m)
- First light: 3 January 1888
- Telescope style: refracting telescope
- Diameter: 36 in (0.91 m)
- Length: 57 ft (17 m)
- Mass: 25,000 lb (11,000 kg)
- Focal length: 17.37 m (57 ft 0 in)
- Enclosure: dome
- Website: www.ucolick.org/main/science/telescopes/refractor.html
- Location of James Lick telescope
- Related media on Commons

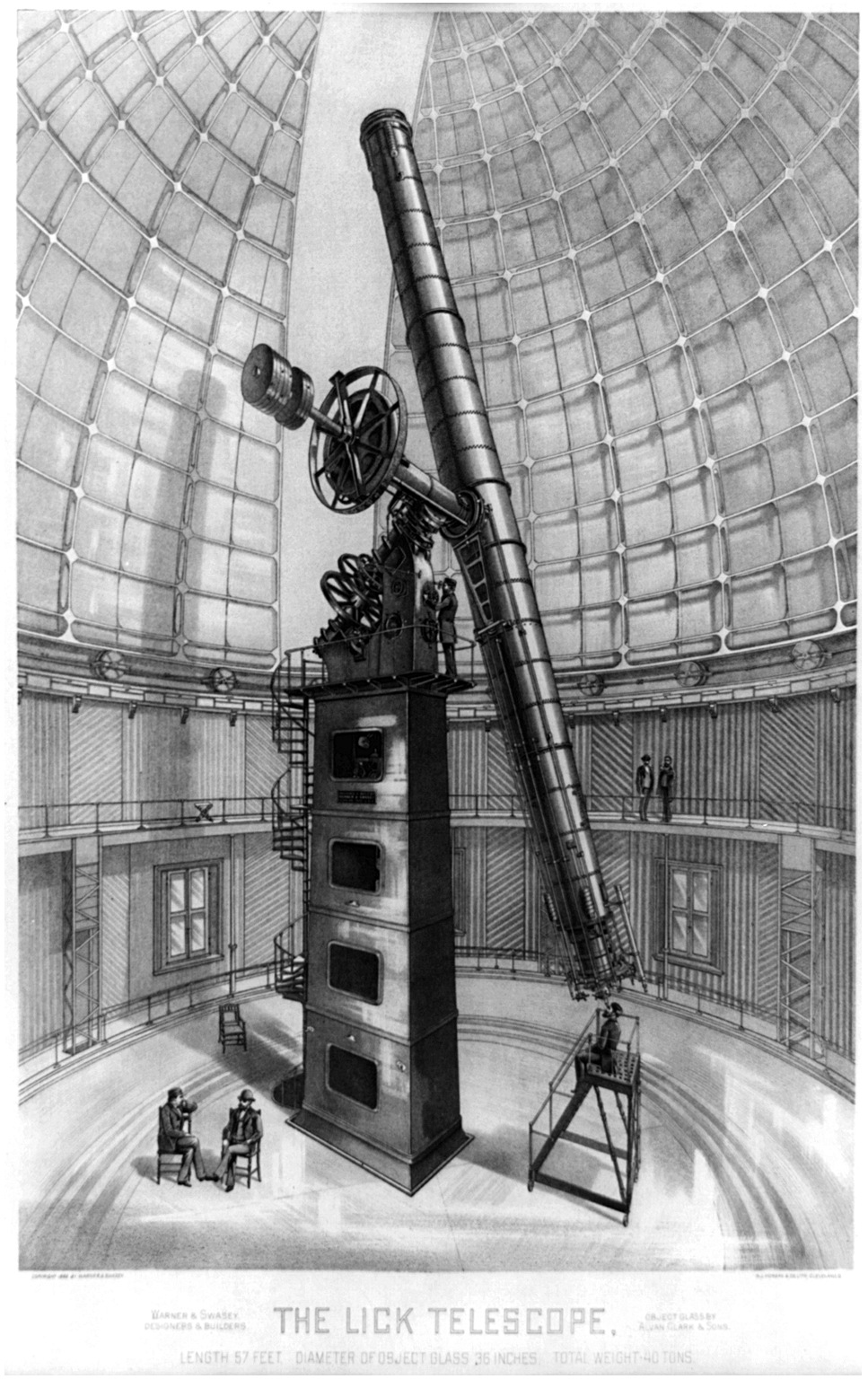
The James Lick Telescope, shown here in an 1889 drawing

The James Lick Telescope is a refracting telescope built in 1888. It has a lens, which is 91 centimetres (36 in) in diameter—a major achievement in its day. The instrument remains in operation and public viewing is allowed on a limited basis. Also called the "Great Lick Refractor" or simply "Lick Refractor", it was the largest refracting telescope in the world until 1897, and now ranks third, after the 40-inch refractor at the Yerkes Observatory and the Swedish 1-m Solar Telescope. (The many larger telescopes in use today are reflecting telescopes, with a mirror rather than lens as the major optical component.) The telescope is located at the University of California's Lick Observatory atop Mount Hamilton at an elevation of 1,283 metres (4,209 ft) above sea level. The instrument is housed inside a dome that is powered by hydraulic systems that raise and lower the floor, rotate the dome and drive the clock mechanism to track the Earth's rotation. The original hydraulic arrangement still operates today, with the exception that the original wind-powered pumps that once filled the reservoirs have been replaced with electric pumps. James Lick is entombed below the floor of the observing room of the telescope.

Here are some excerpts from an 1894 book describing the telescope:

The height of the marble floor of the main building above mean sea level is 4209 feet. On a closely connected peak half a mile to the east of the Observatory, and 50 feet higher, are the reservoirs from which water for household and photographic purposes is distributed. A spring about 350 feet below and one mile to the northeast of the Observatory supplies excellent water. Another peak seven-eighths of a mile to the east is the summit of Mount Hamilton; it is 180 feet higher than the Observatory, and supports the reservoirs supplying power for moving the dome, raising the movable floor, and winding the driving clock of the great telescope. This system receives its supply from the winter rains falling on the roofs; the water being pumped to the reservoirs on the higher peak by means of windmills.

The movable floor in the dome is the first of the kind to be constructed. It is 18 metres (60 ft) in diameter, and can be raised or lowered through a distance of 16 1/2 feet (5.0 m), its purpose being to bring the observer within convenient reach of the eye end of the telescope.

== Construction ==
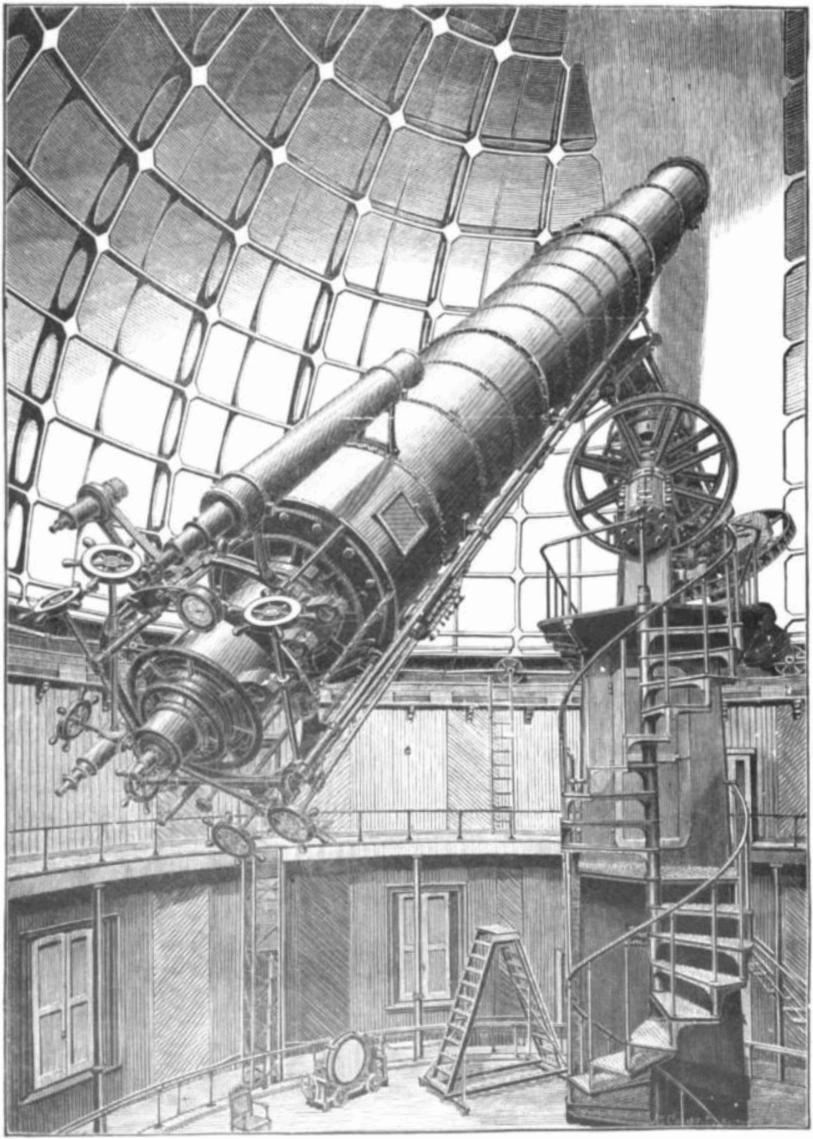
A drawing of the telescope from an astronomy book

The fabrication of the two-element achromatic objective lens, the largest lens ever made at the time, caused years of delay. The famous large telescope maker Alvan Clark, was in charge of the optical design. He gave the contract for casting the high quality optical glass blanks, of a size never before attempted, to the firm of Charles Feil in Paris. One of the huge glass disks broke during shipping, and replacing it was delayed. Finally, after 18 failed attempts, the lens was finished, transported safely across country, and on December 31, 1887, was carefully installed in the telescope tube. The builders had to wait for three days for a break in the clouds to test it. On the evening of January 3, the telescope saw first light, and users found that the instrument could not be focused—an error in the estimation of the lens' focal length had caused the tube to be built too long. A hacksaw was procured, the great tube was unceremoniously cut back to the proper length and the star Aldebaran came into focus.

== Contemporaries on debut ==
Legend
- Reflector (Metal mirror) or unknown
- Glass Reflector (Silver on glass mirror)
- Refractor (Lens)

Name/Observatory	Aperture cm (in)	Type	Location then (Original Site)	Extant*
Yerkes Observatory	102 cm (40″)	achromat	Williams Bay, Wisconsin, USA	1897
National Observatory, Paris	122 cm (48″)	reflector	Paris, France	1875–1943
James Lick telescope, Lick Observatory	91 cm (36″)	achromat	Mount Hamilton, California, USA	1888
Crossley Reflector	91.4 cm (36″)	reflector – glass	Lick Observatory, USA	1896

== See also ==
- List of largest optical telescopes in the 19th century
