= Shuckburgh telescope =

Telescope built in 1791

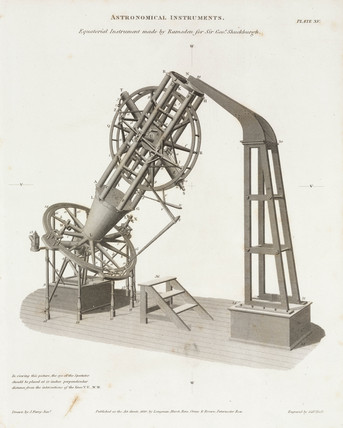
- Alternative names: Shuckburgh equatorial refracting telescope
- Location(s): United Kingdom
- Diameter: 4.1 in (0.10 m)
- Related media on Commons

The Shuckburgh telescope or Shuckburgh equatorial refracting telescope was a 4.1 inches (10.4 cm) diameter aperture telescope on an equatorial mount completed in 1791 for Sir George Shuckburgh (1751–1804) in Warwickshire, England, and built by British instrument maker Jesse Ramsden (1735–1800). It was transferred to the Royal Observatory, Greenwich in 1811 and the London Science Museum in 1929. Even though it has sometimes not been regarded as particularly successful, its design was influential. It was one of the larger achromatic doublet telescopes at the time, and one of the largest to have an equatorial mount. It was also known as the eastern equatorial for its location.

It was pictured in the Rees Cyclopedia of the early 1800s. It was early pictured in Philosophical Transactions, published in 1793.

At the Royal Observatory in Greenwich, it was for a time installed in the North Dome, although this had a Sky view partially obscured by the Octagon room. It was earlier installed as an alt-az mount in the South dome at Greenwich, which in 1838 is where the then-new 6.7 inch aperture Sheepshanks refractor was installed.

The telescope tube is 5 feet four inches long (about 1.6 meters). The focal length was the same for this telescope, with object glass being doublet of 4.1 inch (~10.4 cm) aperture.

Shuckburgh placed an order with Ramsden for the telescope in 1781, and it was delivered for his observatory ten years later. He also ordered a clock from John Arnold & Son to use with the telescope. The telescope was installed at Shuckburgh Hall, in Warwickshire, United Kingdom.

== Observations ==
The Shuckburgh/ Eastern telescope was used for the 1832 transit of Mercury equipped with a micrometer by Dollond. By observing the transit in combination with timing it and taking measures, a diameter for the planet was taken. They also reported the peculiar effects that they compared to pressing a coin into the Sun. The observer remarked:

I afterwards observed, that immediately around the planet there was a dusky tinge, making it appear as if, in a small degree sunk below the sun's surface;

The Shuckburgh and the western equatorial at Greenwich are recorded as having been used for observations of the 1835 apparition of Halley's Comet.

The Shuckburgh, also called the "Eastern Equatorial" at the time Halley's comet was sometimes used with a micrometer microscope. For the observations of Halley's 1835, the Transit and Arnold 1 and 2 clocks were used. Observations were recorded in August, September, and October, but it could not view the comet after October 19, because its view was blocked by another part of the observatory building.

The Shuckburgh is also reported to have been used for observing the occultation of stars by the Moon and observing the moons of Jupiter.

== See also ==
- Aerial telescope
- Edward Troughton
- Peter Dollond
- Great refractors
- List of largest optical telescopes in the 18th century
- Greenwich 28 inch refractor (Another RGO telescope)
- List of largest optical telescopes in the British Isles
- Sheepshanks equatorial (6.7 inch refractor also at Greenwich)
