= Sheepshanks equatorial =

Telescope installed at the Royal Observatory in Greenwich, United Kingdom

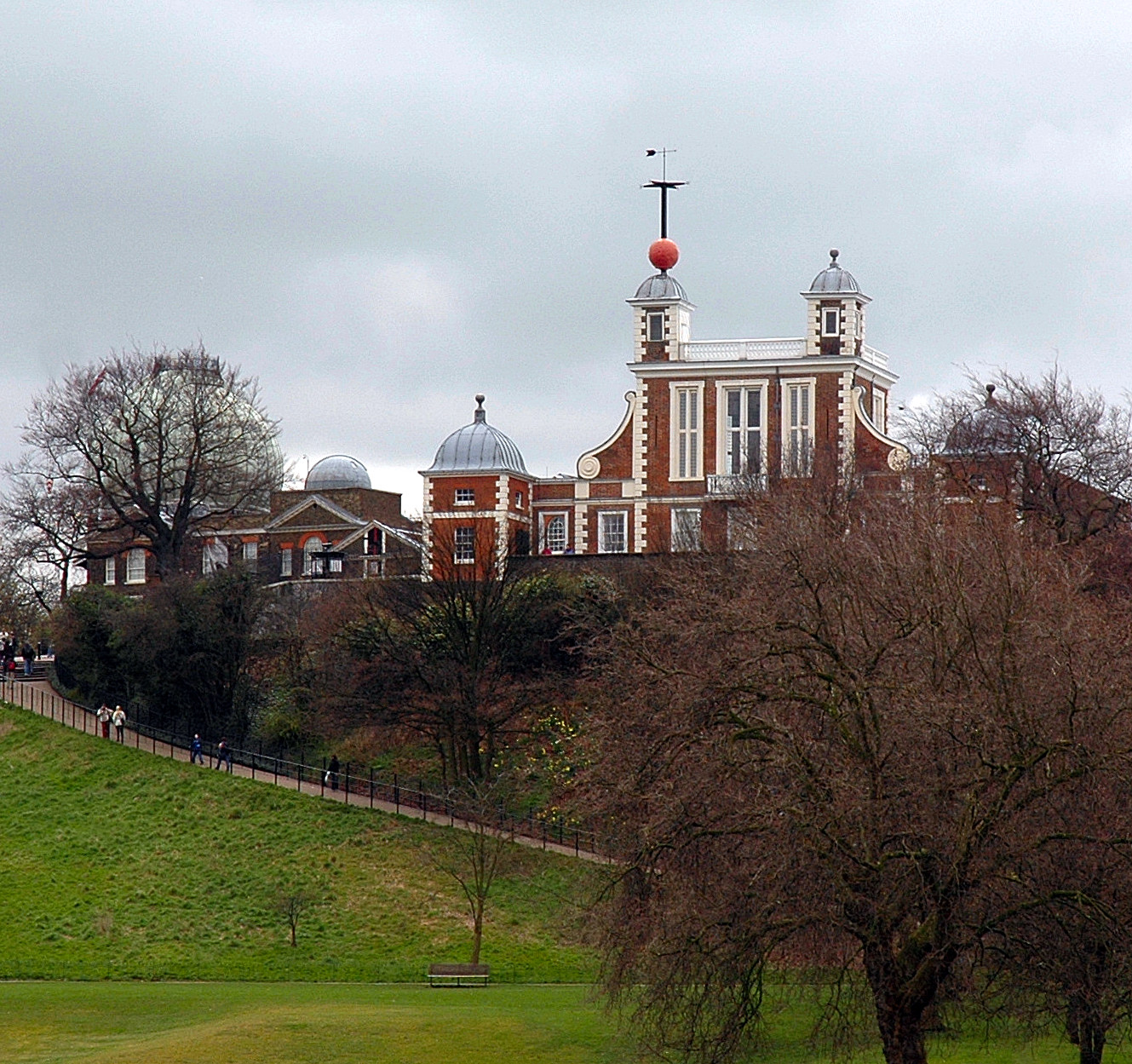
The Sheepshanks dome is in between the Flamsteed house (on the right), and the Great Equatorial dome on the far left (partially obscured by a tree).

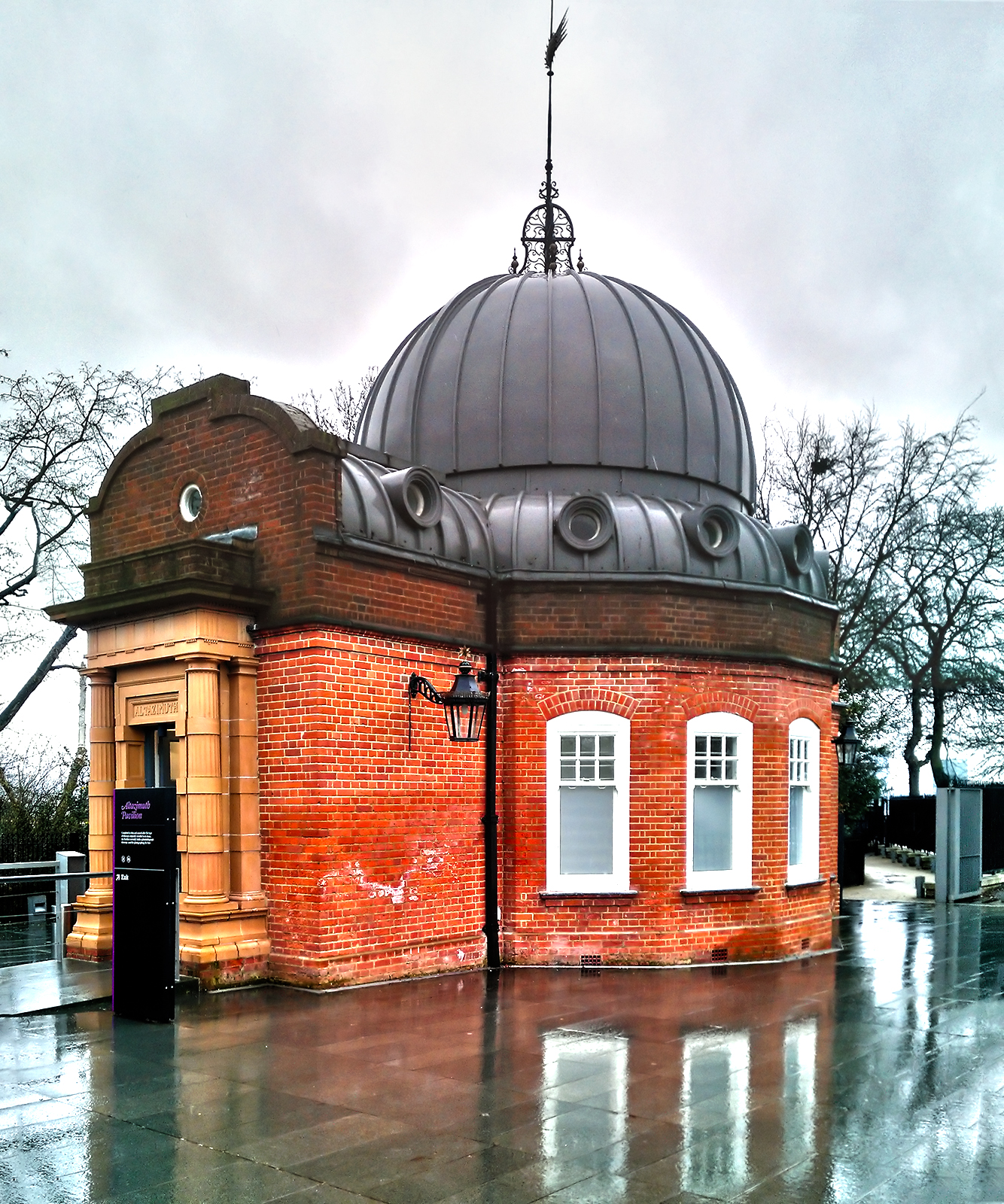
The Sheepshanks was operated from the Altazimuth Pavilion from 1963 to 1982.

The Sheepshanks Equatorial Telescope was a 6.7-inch (170 mm) aperture refracting telescope installed in 1838 at the Royal Observatory in Greenwich. The telescope was donated to the observatory by the astronomer Richard Sheepshanks. The telescope had a doublet objective lens made by Cauchoix of Paris. Originally it was mounted on a clockwork driven equatorial mounting by the Grubb Telescope Company on a stone pillar.

From 1835 to 1963 it was mounted in Greenwich Observatory's Sheepshanks Dome (located between the later Great Equatorial Building and the Prime Meridian); from 1963 to 1982 it was mounted in the Altazimuth Pavilion. In the early 1980s it was placed in storage.

The focal length of the telescope has been quoted as 6 feet 2 1/2 inches (1.892 meters) in one source, but according to another it is 8 feet 2 inches (2.49 meters). The telescope tube was made of wood.

An 1840 report from the Observatory noted of the new Sheepshanks telescope:

The power and general goodness of this telescope make it a most welcome addition to the instruments of the observatory

Still in service over half a century later, an 1896 report by W. H. M. Christie had this to say about the Sheepshanks at that time:

Its definition is good: A small quantity of colour from the secondary spectrum, and a diffusion of light from brilliant objects, being the principal defects.

At one time the Sheepshanks refractor was the largest aperture telescope at Greenwich. One of the instruments for the telescope was a wire micrometer.

== Observations ==
One of its observations was of Comet Encke. The Sheepshanks was used to observe the Moon occulting stars in 1905. Some of the stars that were observed include Bradley 687, 130 Tauri, and 26 Geminorum- among others.

In addition to the occultation of stars by the Moon, the Sheepshanks equatorial is also reported to have been used to observe the moons of Jupiter.

== Disambiguation ==
There are other telescopes bearing the name Sheepshanks, for example the Sheepshanks telescope No 3; this was a telescope of 4.6 inches aperture and 5 feet of focal length, used with a spectroscope in the 1860s. There was also a Sheepshanks telescope at Cambridge, completed in 1898.

== See also ==
- Shuckburgh telescope (1791)
