= Potsdam Great Refractor =

Historic astronomical telescope

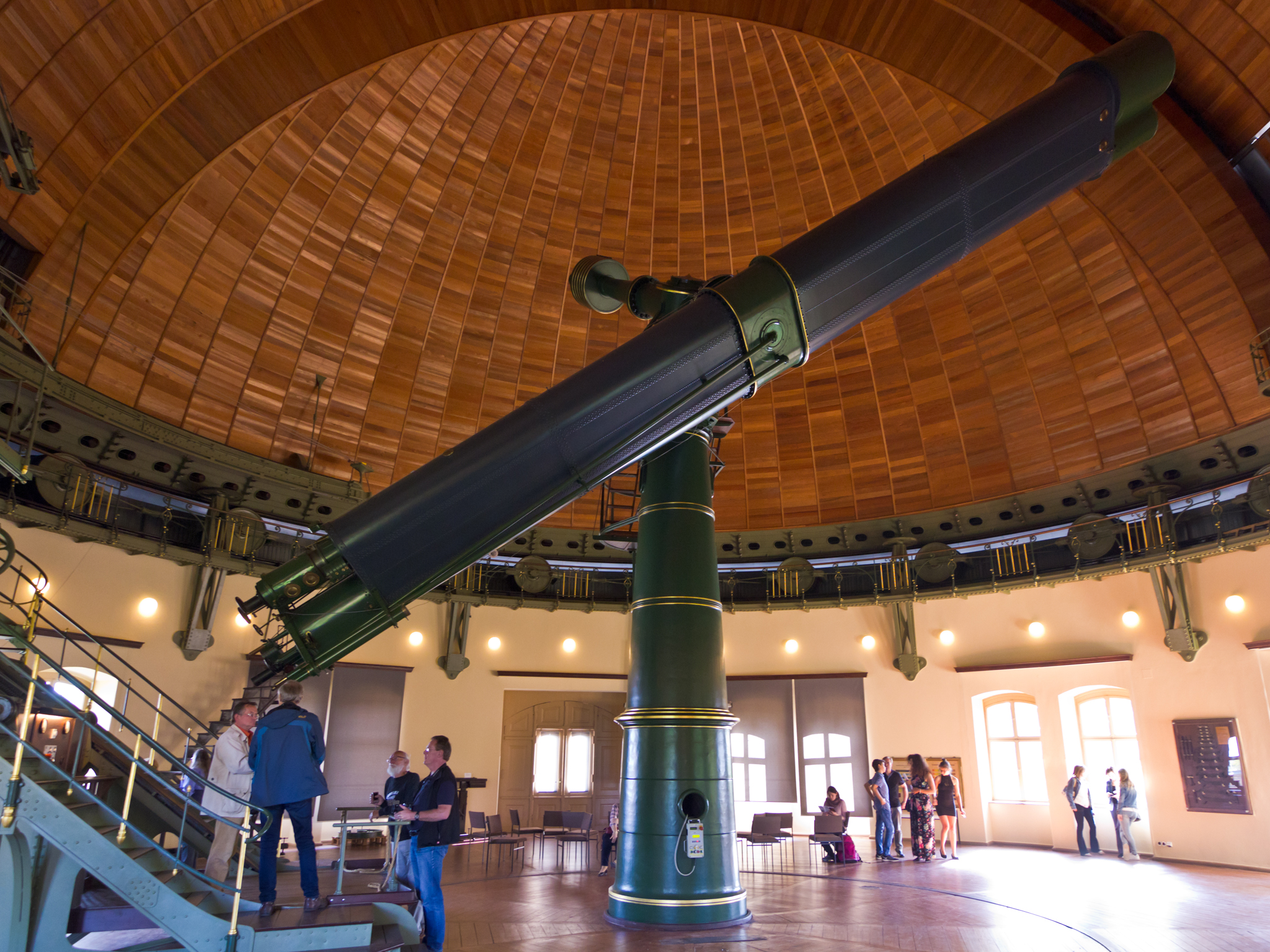
The "Große Refraktor" of 1899, a double telescope with a 80cm (31.5") and 50 cm (19.5") lenses

Potsdam Great Refractor (Große Refraktor) is an historic astronomical telescope in an observatory in Potsdam, Brandenburg, Germany.

Completed in 1899, it is a double telescope for astronomy; a great refractor with two objectives of different size on the same equatorial mount. One lens in 80 cm in aperture and the other is 50 cm. The 80 cm diameter lens was designed for astrophotography, and the 50 cm diameter lens for visual work.

The telescope was made by A. Repsold. The objective lens glass blanks were made in Jena by Schott. The lenses were figured by C.A. Steinheil of Munich.

== History ==
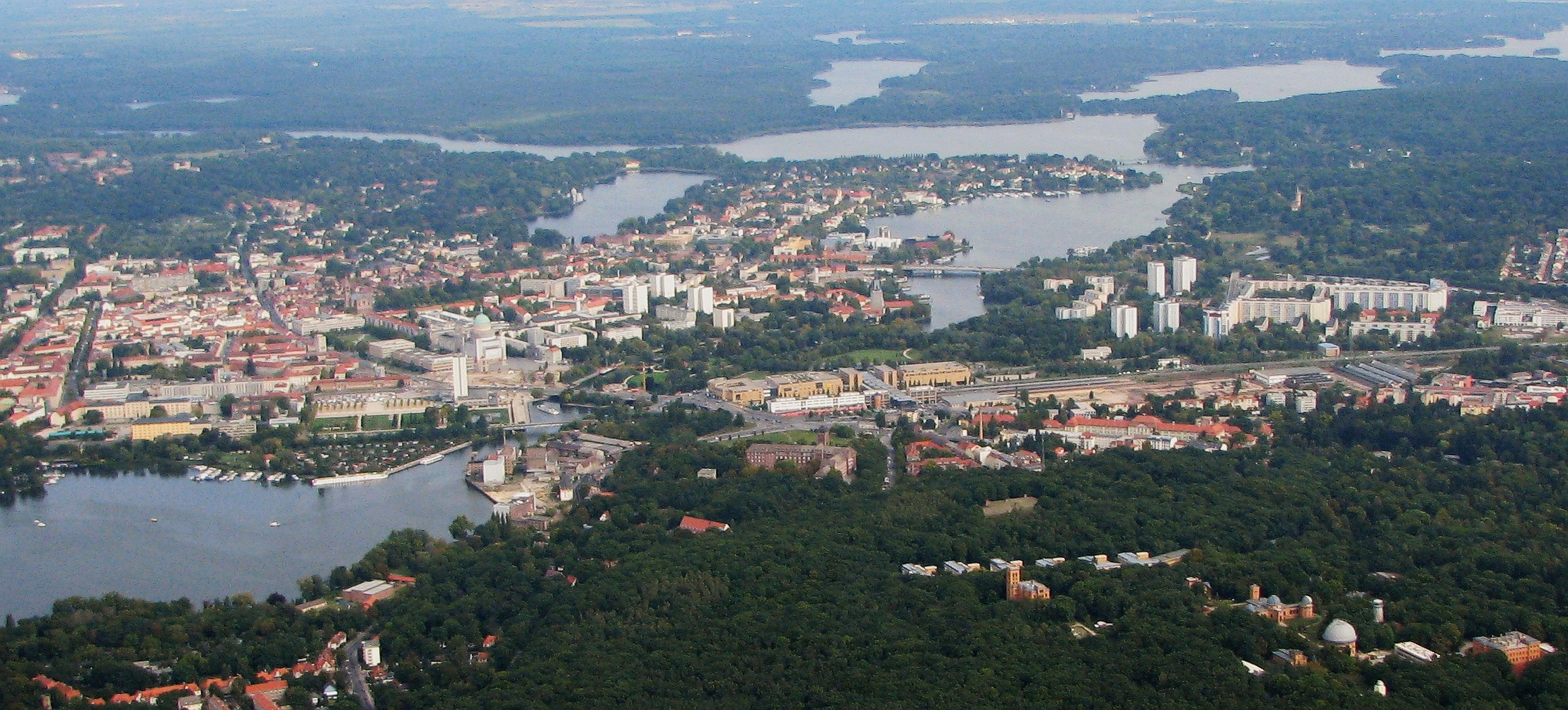
The Great Refractor dome is in the lower right, situated on Telegraph Hill overlooking Potsdam city (2008)

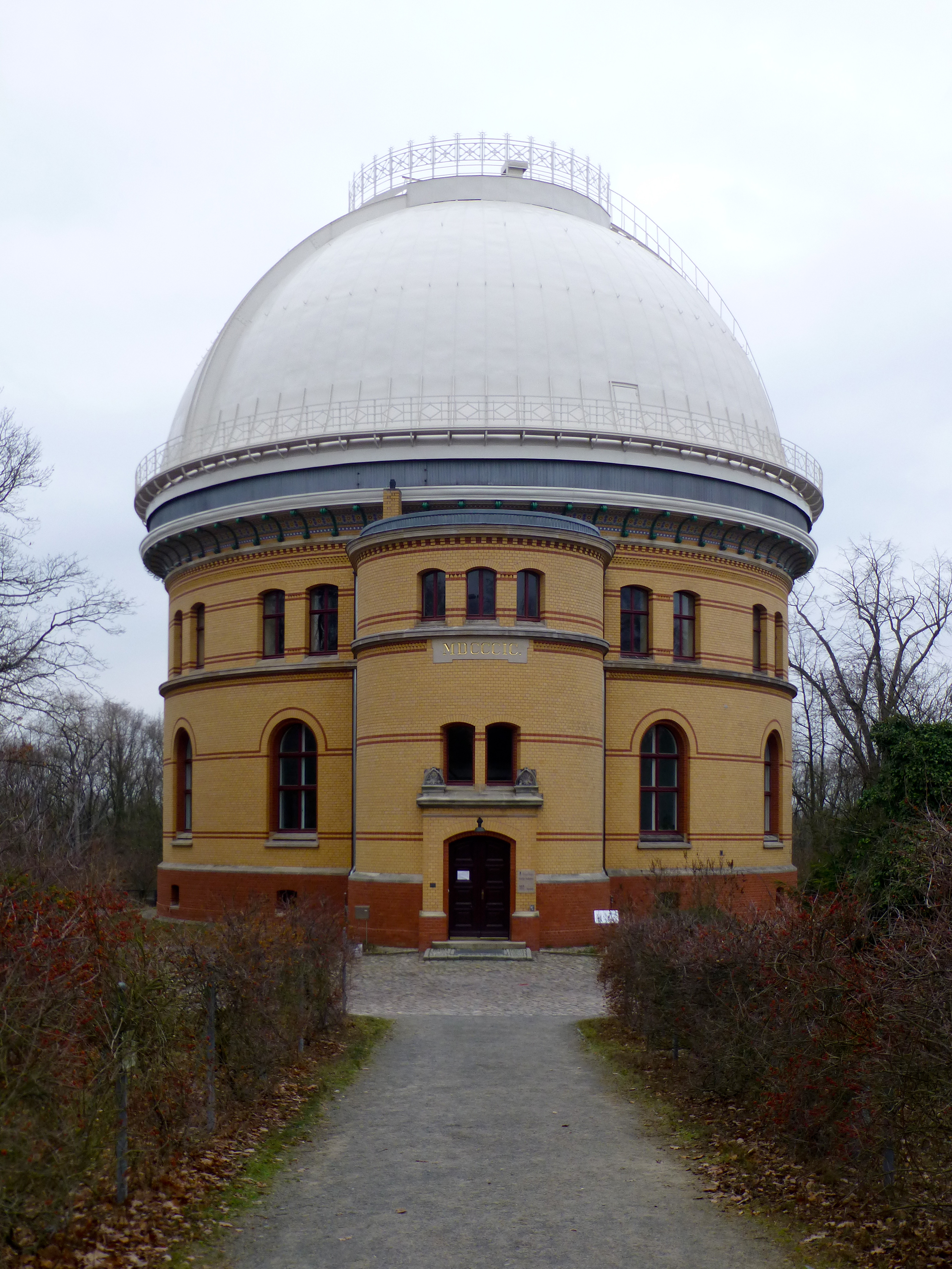
Facility housing the telescope, 2018

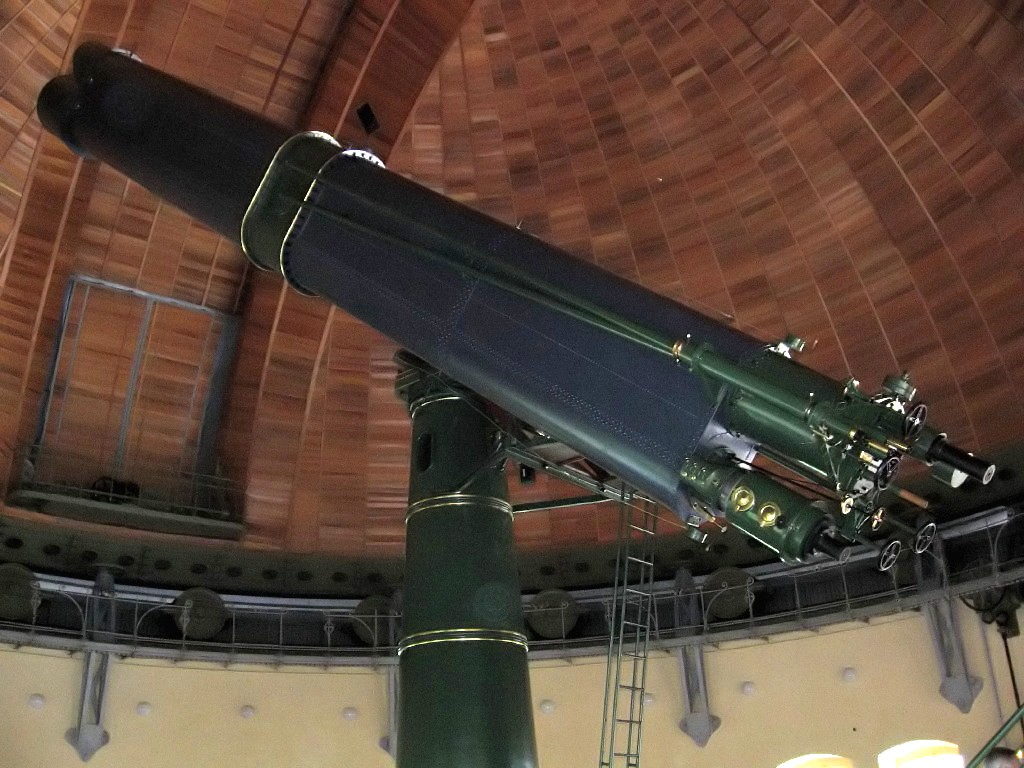
Another view of the refractor, showing the double tubes and mount inside the wood and iron dome (2007)

An observatory had been established in the late 1870s near Potsdam, and had gained notice for its work on photographic spectroscopy of stars.

A new telescope was acquired by 1899, to continue this work and by 1904 the interstellar medium was discovered spectroscopically. The telescope mostly survived to the 21st century with an archive of photographic plates, and is a popular tourist destination in the modern day after the site was restored.

With this type of telescope, the dome opening must move in synchrony with the telescope or the view would be blocked; in addition the floor inside the dome also moves to keep the astronomer aligned with viewing end of the telescope.

Background & Development

The observatory institution the Astrophysical Observatory Potsdam (AOP) was founded in 1878. The observatory started off with various instruments including a 30 cm (~11.8 in.) refractor by Schroeder and a 20 cm (8 in) from Grubb Telescope Company. A larger double telescope with a combination of visual and astrographic refractors was installed in 1889. This had an aperture of 32 cm for photography, and a smaller 24 cm for visual work. This telescope was used in support of the Carte du Ciel, international astronomical project. Other projects of the observatory include solar observations, spectroscopy, and a stellar luminosity catalog with many stars from the Bonner Durchmusterung (BD) .

In the mid-1800s the principle of Doppler frequency shifting was discovered, and the next step was to apply this to changes in frequency of light, and further enhancement was achieved with photographic spectroscopy.

The 30 cm Schrodeder telescope was used to take the spectrum of stars photographically, and the observatory became known for its work on stellar spectrographs. By 1892, they published a list of 52 photographic-based radial velocities from spectroscopy. However, with this they ran out of stars that could be observed with photographic spectroscopy using the 30 cm (12 inch) Schroder. A bigger telescope would be needed to expand this area of study.

Major discoveries that the observatory was recognized for, were determining that Spica was spectroscopic binary in 1878, and also breakthrough on understanding of Algol.

.. Therefore when the spectrographic method shall have been thoroughly applied with great modern telescopes, we may confidently look forward to an enormous expansion of our knowledge of motions in the stellar universe

— A Treatise on Astronomical Spectroscopy, 1894

Also, while the newer 32 cm astrograph was felt to be adequate for photography, the director of the observatory was unhappy with its performance in spectroscopy. Thus planning for a larger instrument, and a building to house it was undertaken in the 1890s.

In 1895 a new instrument for the observatory was approved.

Design & Construction

Aperture (cm)	Aperture (in)	Focal Length (m)	Purpose	Refs
80	~31.5	12.2	Photographic	
50	~19.69	12.5	Visual	

The overall telescope was built by Repsold. Repsold was a German optics company started by the astronomer Johann Georg Repsold, and made various optical instruments until 1919; they were based out of Hamburg. Both objectives were figured by Steinheil from glass blanks made by Schott. Steinheil was a German optics company founded by Carl August von Steinheil.

The two objective lenses were completed by the firm Steinheil of Munich, figured from glass blanks made by Schott in Jena.

The 50 cm was designed optical for the human visual range, and was intended as a guide for the photographic telescope. The visual 50 cm was regarded as satisfactory, although Bernhard Schmidt adjusted the lens figuring in 1911 and 1914. The 80 cm was found to have some chromatic errors and Astigmatism, that lead to some refiguring of the optics in following years, as well as development of a new optical test.

First light & Beyond

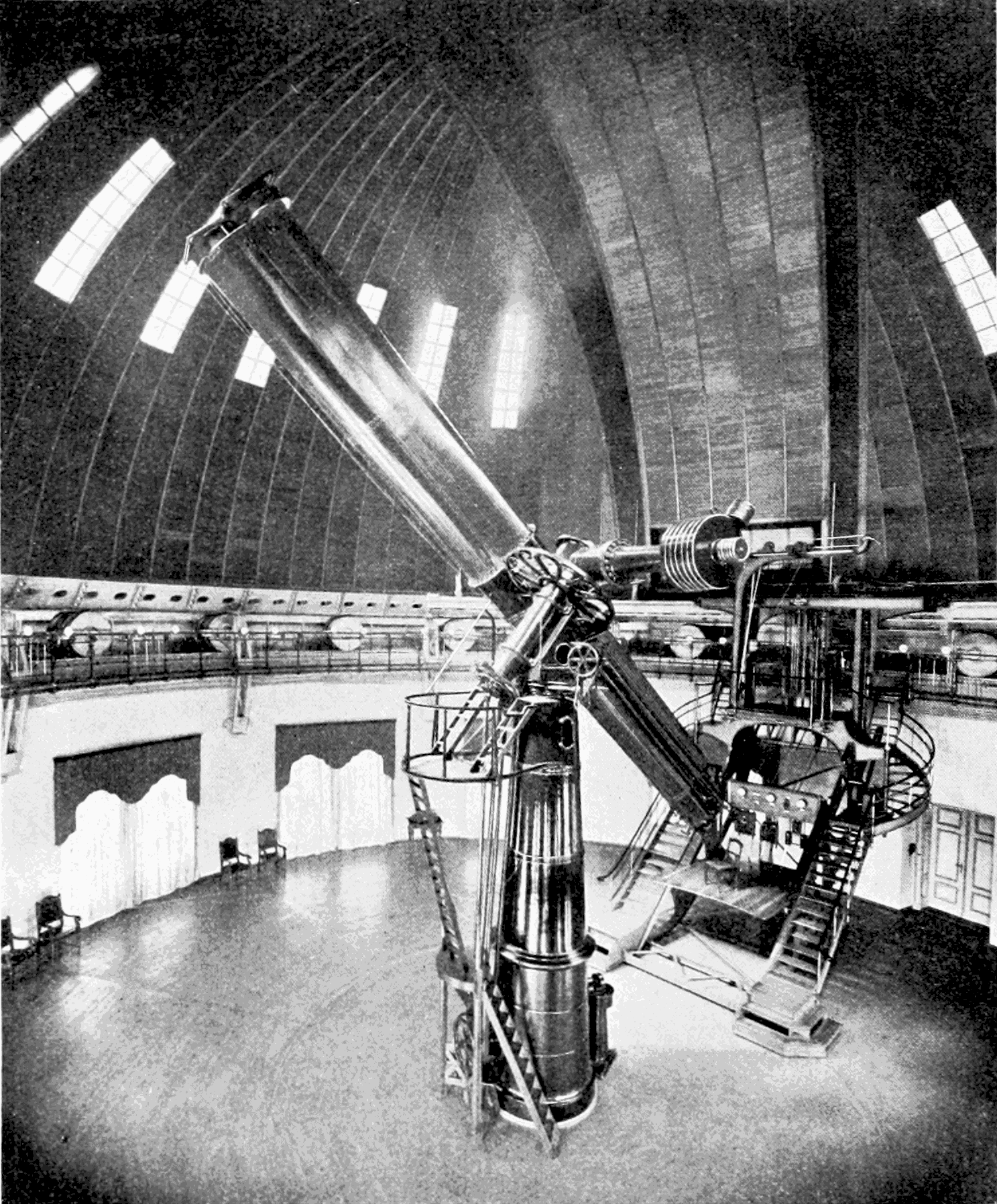
In a 1900 issue of Popular Science magazine

The telescope was inaugurated in August 1899 with attendance by Kaiser Wilhelm II. There was also an address by Director Vogel at the dedication.

The Hartmann test was developed in response to the need to test the 80 cm objective lens, and this test became a famous way to test the optical properties of instruments in the 20th century. The telescope had a problem being used for spectroscopy and Hartmann developed the mask test to identify the issue with the main objective lens; this led to the lens being refigured to help the problem.

Inaugural instruments for the telescope included two spectrographs.

In 1904, one of the discoveries made using the telescope was of the interstellar medium. The astronomer Professor Hartmann determined from observations of the binary star Mintaka in Orion, that there was the element calcium in the intervening space.

The telescope was damaged during World War II, but repaired in the early 1950s.

Astronomical science work with the telescope was concluded in 1968, after which there was only basic upkeep for a long time. In 1983 the building was recognized as a historical monument.

A foundation for preservation and function of the Great Refractor was founded in 1997, and with a considerable donation the telescope and site were refurbished with increased quality and made available for public observation programmes. The organization that organized this was called Förderverein Großer Refraktor Potsdam e.V., working in coordination with the observatory and benefactors.

The Great Refractor building is also noted for storing a collection of thousands of photographic plates. These photographic plates, which in some cases date back to the late 19th century, are valued in modern times for software driven searches. (see also precovery)

In May 2006, the telescope and facility were reopened after an extensive refurbishment of the telescope and dome mechanisms. This included the dismantling of the great refractor in Jena by an engineering team. In addition, important mechanical parts of the facility needed for operation of the telescope, such as the dome mechanism, were restored.

In 2017, after a year of restoration work on the dome and building, the Great double lens telescope facility was re-opened.

In 2019, the double refractor building hosted a reception for dignitaries, including Dutch royals, politicians, and bureaucrats from various organizations.

== Dome and site ==
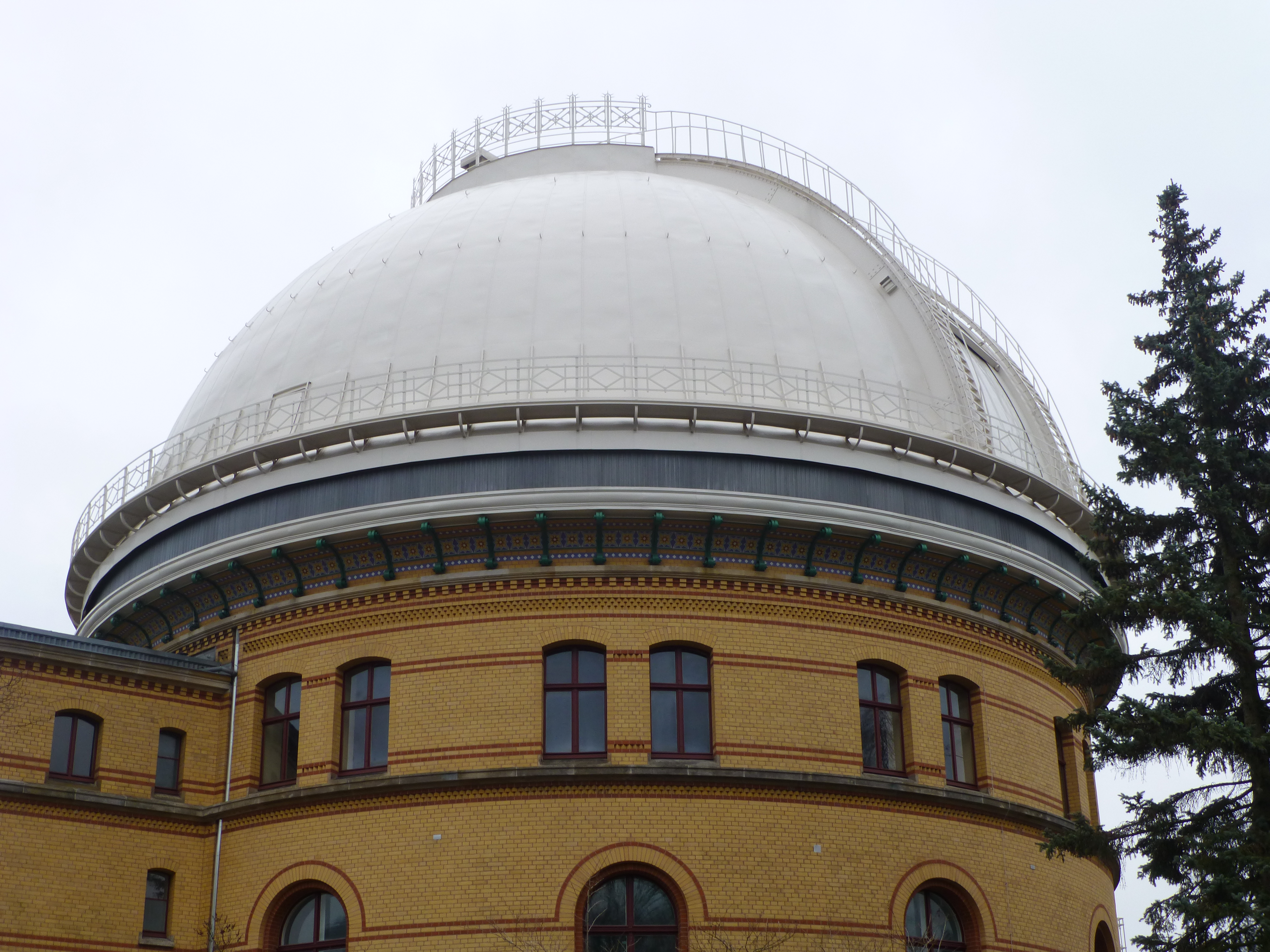
Closer view of restored dome and building

The moving weight of the telescope is 7000 kg (7 (metric) tons), and the dome weighs 200 (metric) tons (200 000 kg). The dome is constructed primarily of iron and wood, with the iron component manufactured by Bretschnieder and Kruger, while the wood was from Joester of Potsdam.

The dome could be rotated around in five minutes by electric motors, but it also had a manual turning option. The electric controls could be operated near where the observer would be. Also the entire floor could be rotated along with the dome to keep the observer aligned with the telescope.

The interior floor was done by Hoppe and the electric drive systems by Siemens & Halske.

The new dome was built in the style of the existing buildings, which had been designed by P. Spieker. Two concepts for the new building were to have harmony with the older buildings and have the same design style.

The telescope and its dome were erected in Telegraph Hill (Telegrafenberg),. Today the building is located in Albert Einstein Science Park.

== Spectrographs ==
Two new spectrograph instruments were developed for the Great double refractor. There was a larger one that used three prisms, with the prisms made by Steinheil. The spectrograph weighed 31 kg, and was installed on the end of the telescope.

The other spectrograph weighted 20 kg, but only had a single prism made by Zeiss in Jena.

An ultraviolet spectrograph was commissioned by the observatory and built by Toepfer and Son, however the 80 cm was limited to 360 nm wavelength light. Astronomical Spectrographs and Their History reports that the instrument worked in the lab down to 285 nm.

== See also ==
- List of largest optical refracting telescopes
- List of largest optical telescopes in the 20th century
- Leibniz Institute for Astrophysics Potsdam
- Einstein Tower (A nearby solar observatory and historical structure, erected 1924)
- Timeline of knowledge about the interstellar and intergalactic medium
