= Mintaka (disambiguation) =

Mintaka is a triple star system.

Mintaka may also refer to:

- USS Mintaka (AK-94), a US WWII navy ship
- Mintaka Pass, a mountain pass between China and Pakistan
