= Albert Einstein Science Park =

Research institute in Germany

Coordinates: 52°22′49″N 13°03′54″E

The Albert Einstein Science Park is located on the Telegrafenberg hill in Potsdam, Germany. The park was named after the physicist Albert Einstein. The best known buildings in the park are the Einstein Tower, an astrophysical observatory that was built to perform checks of Einstein's theory of General Relativity; and the Great Refractor of Potsdam, which today belong to the Astrophysical Institute Potsdam. These buildings, along with various astronomical, meteorological, and geophysical observatories were integrated into an English-style country garden.

The park was named after Albert Einstein in 1992.

The park had already been designed by the middle 19th century according to plans by the architect Paul Emanuel Spieker on Telegrafenberg

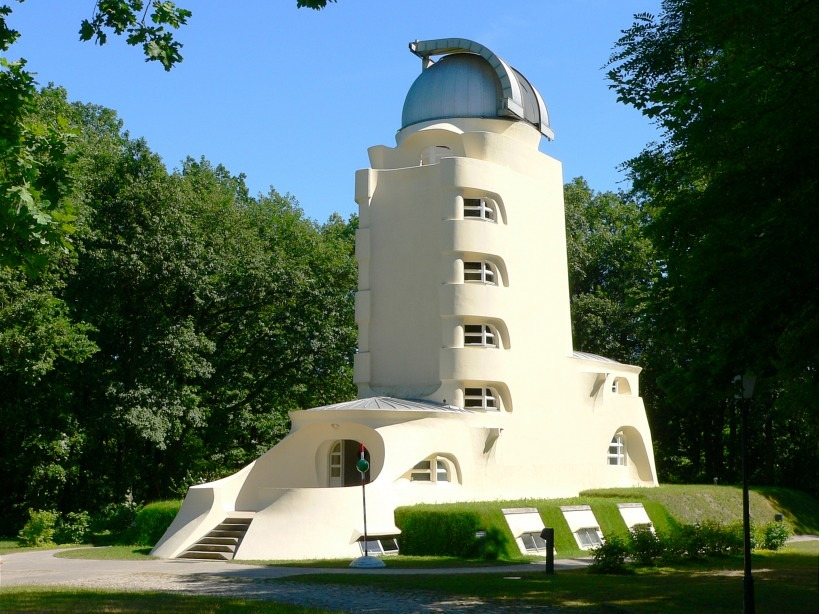
The Einsteinturm in the Albert Einstein Science Park

Since 1992 the following newly founded institutes have properties situated on the grounds:

- German Research Centre for Geosciences
- Astrophysical Institute Potsdam
- Alfred Wegener Institute for Polar and Marine Research
- Potsdam Institute for Climate Impact Research

In the 1990s the historical buildings were extensively restored and numerous new buildings were erected.

The Einstein Tower and the observatory of the Great Refractor of Potsdam also host exhibits.

Buildings are interspersed with an English country garden style landscaping and also vegetable garden areas until the 1980s.
