= Leibniz Institute for Astrophysics Potsdam =

Research facility for astrophysics in Germany

Coordinates: 52°24′18″N 13°06′15″E

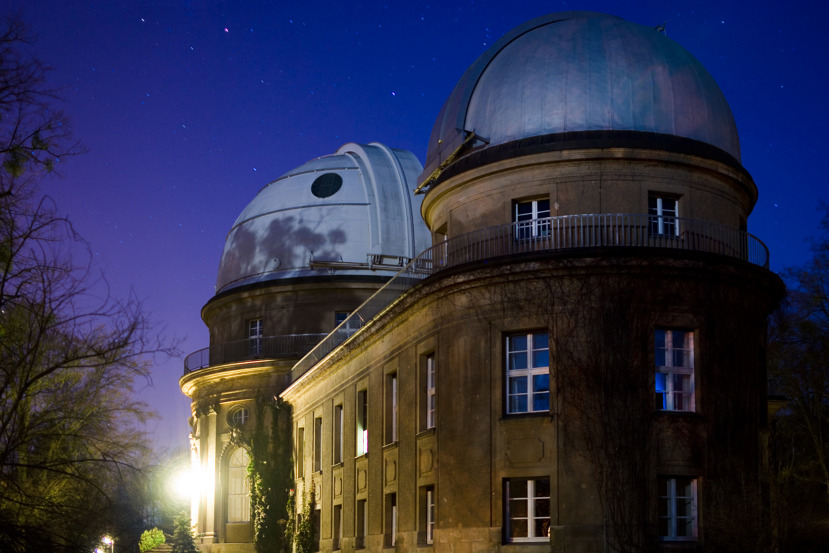
- Main building in Babelsberg
- Chair: Matthias Steinmetz
- Staff: approx. 200
- Location: Potsdam-Babelsberg
- Website: www.aip.de

Leibniz Institute for Astrophysics Potsdam (AIP) is a German research institute. It is the successor of the Berlin Observatory founded in 1700 and of the Astrophysical Observatory Potsdam (AOP) founded in 1874. The latter was the world's first observatory to emphasize explicitly the research area of astrophysics. The AIP was founded in 1992, in a re-structuring following the German reunification.

The AIP is privately funded and member of the Leibniz Association. It is located in Babelsberg in the state of Brandenburg, just west of Berlin, though the Einstein Tower solar observatory and the great refractor telescope on Telegrafenberg in Potsdam belong to the AIP.

The key topics of the AIP are cosmic magnetic fields (magnetohydrodynamics) on various scales and extragalactic astrophysics. Astronomical and astrophysical fields studied at the AIP range from solar and stellar physics to stellar and galactic evolution to cosmology.

The institute also develops research technology in the fields of spectroscopy and robotic telescopes. It is a partner of the Large Binocular Telescope in Arizona, has erected robotic telescopes in Tenerife and the Antarctic, develops astronomical instrumentation for large telescopes such as the VLT of the ESO. Furthermore, work on several e-Science projects are carried out at the AIP.

== History ==
=== Origin ===
The history of astronomy in Potsdam really began in Berlin in 1700. Initiated by Gottfried W. Leibniz, on 11 July 1700 the "Brandenburgische Societät" (later called the Prussian Academy of Sciences) was founded by the elector Friedrich III in Berlin. Two months earlier the national calendar monopoly provided the funding for an observatory. By 18 May the first director, Gottfried Kirch, had been appointed. This happened in a hurry, because the profits from the national basic calendar, calculated and sold by the observatory, should have been the financial source for the academy. This kind of financing existed until the beginning of the 19th century, but the basic calendar was calculated until very recently (it stopped after the Wende in 1991).

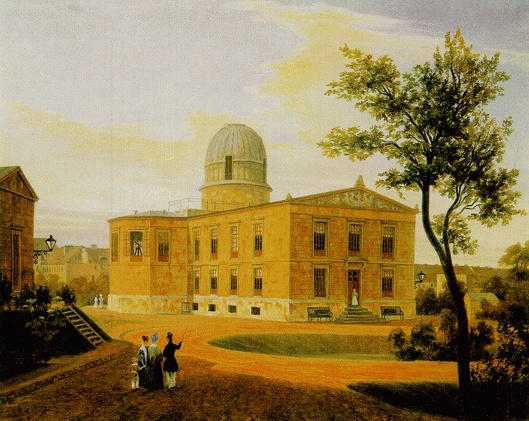
Alte New Berliner Sternwarte at Linden Street

In 1711 the first observatory was built in Dorotheen Street in Berlin and in 1835 a new observatory building, which was designed by the famous architect Karl Friedrich Schinkel, was completed in Linden Street (near Hallesches Tor). Alexander von Humboldt was then promoting astronomy by his famous "Kosmos" lectures in 1827–28. He played an important role in providing the funds for both observatory and instruments.

The Berlin Observatory became known worldwide when Johann Gottfried Galle discovered the planet Neptune in 1846. The discoveries of the canal rays by Eugen Goldstein in 1886 in the physical laboratory of the observatory and of the variation in the altitude of the Earth's pole by Karl Friedrich Küstner in 1888 were likewise important.

The last two scientific events took place when Wilhelm Julius Foerster was director of the observatory, which was meanwhile attached to the University of Berlin. He prepared the basis for the astronomical observatories in Potsdam: in 1874 the foundation of the AOP on the Telegrafenberg and in 1913 the removal of the Berlin Observatory to Babelsberg.

=== Foundation of the Astrophysical Observatory Potsdam (AOP) ===
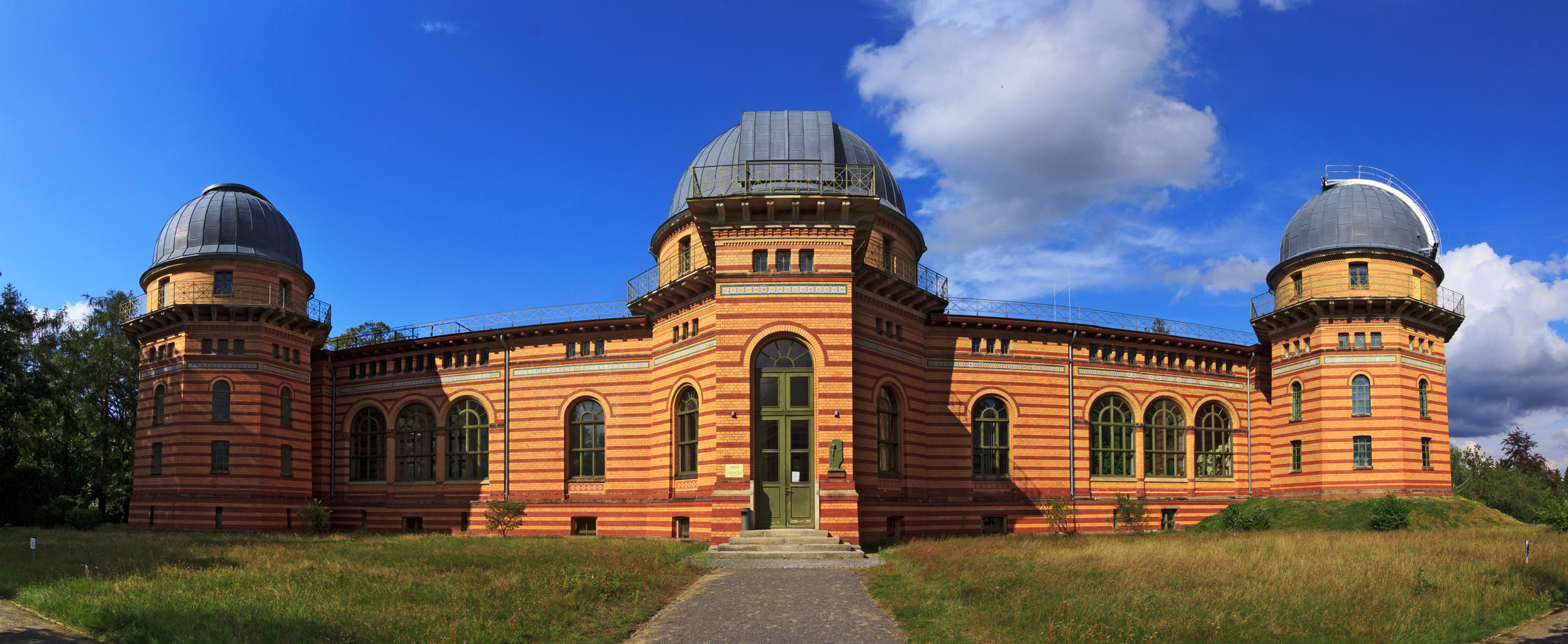
The Astrophysical Observatory Potsdam isn't used as observatory any more. Nowadays it hosts the Potsdam Institute for Climate Impact Research as part of the Albert Einstein Science Park

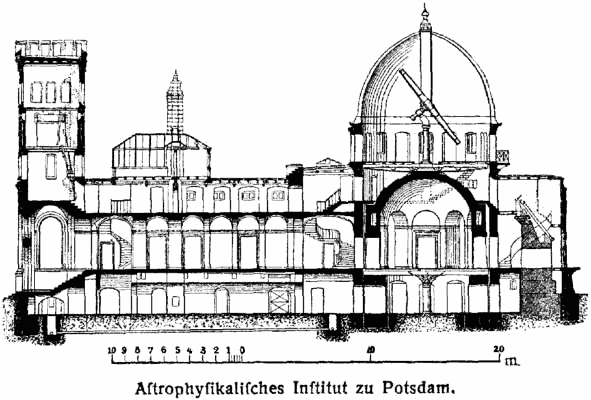
Cross-section of the Astrophysical Observatory Potsdam

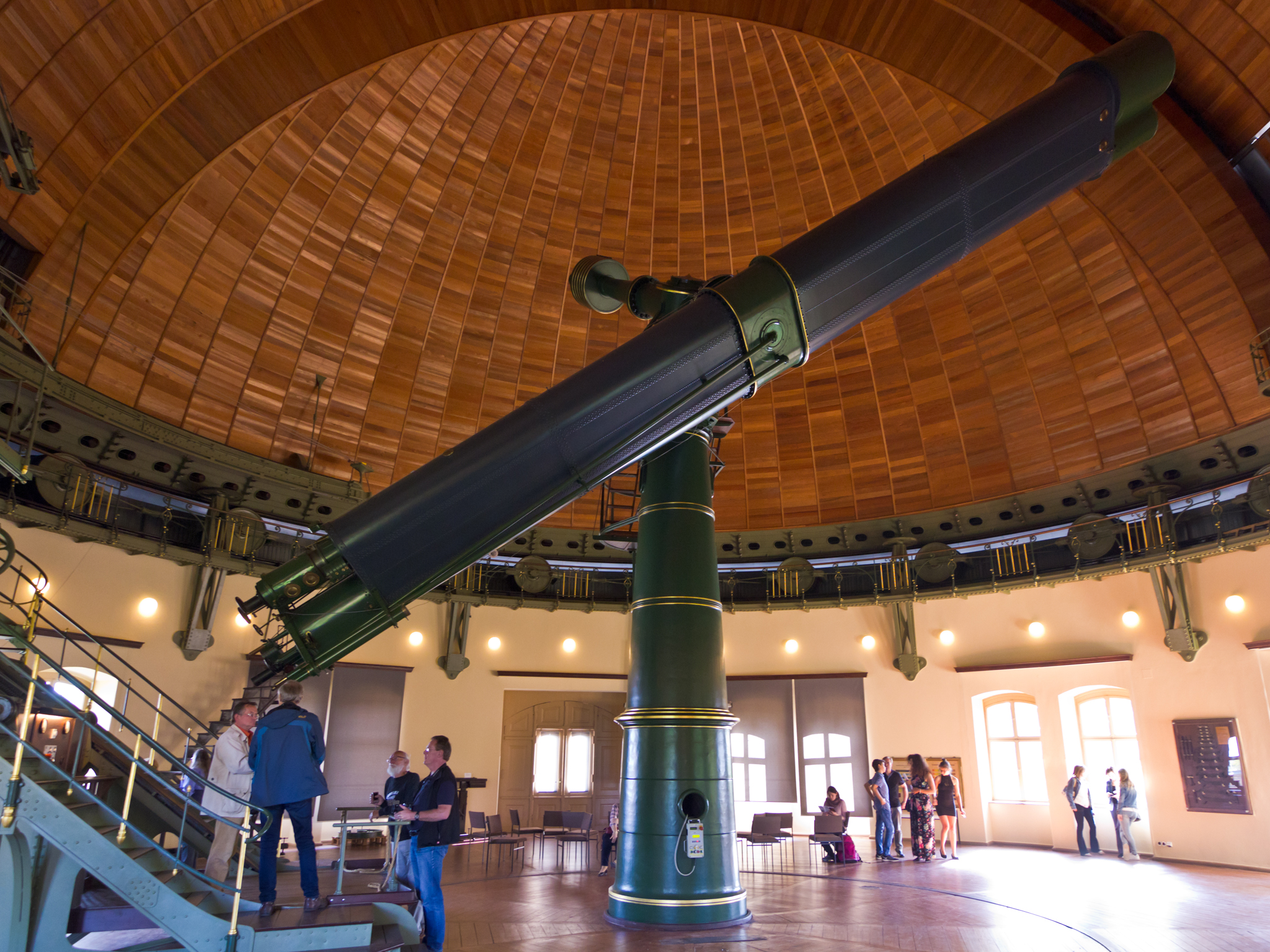
The "Große Refraktor" of 1899, a double telescope with a 80cm (31.5") and 50 cm (19.5") lenses

In the middle of the 19th century spectral analysis was developed by Gustav Kirchhoff and Robert Bunsen. It enabled the acquisition of information on the physical parameters and chemical abundances of stars, by the spectral analysis of their light. Foerster recognized these possibilities and initiated the building of a solar observatory in 1871 as a memorial to the crown prince, in which he emphasized the importance and profit of solar research. This idea was soon extended to the whole of astrophysics.

The site of the observatory was chosen on a hill south of Potsdam, the Telegrafenberg, on which had been, from 1832 to 1848, a relay station of the military telegraph from Berlin to Koblenz. On 1 July 1874 the AOP was founded. Even before the construction of the observatory had started in the autumn of 1876, solar observations were being made from the tower of the former military orphanage in Linden Street in Potsdam by Gustav Spörer. The construction work started in 1876; the main observatory building and its equipment were finished in the autumn of 1879.

The AOP was managed by a board of directors comprising Wilhelm Julius Foerster, Gustav Kirchhoff and Arthur Auwers. In 1882 Carl Hermann Vogel was appointed as sole director of the observatory. The main focus of his work was now on stellar astrophysics. He was the first successfully to determine radial velocities of stars photographically and as a result he discovered the spectroscopic binaries.

In 1899 one of the biggest refractor in the world, Great Refractor of Potsdam, with lenses of 80 and 50 cm, was manufactured by the firms of Steinheil and Repsold, and mounted in a 24 m dome. It was inaugurated in a great celebration by the German emperor, Wilhelm II. Although it did not realize all the hopes astronomers had for it, nevertheless two important discoveries should be mentioned: the interstellar calcium lines in the spectrum of the spectroscopic binary Delta Orionis by Johannes Hartmann in 1904 and the presence of stellar calcium emission lines — a hint of stellar surface activity — by Gustav Eberhard and Hans Ludendorff about 1900.

Ten years later one of the most famous astrophysicists of this century, Karl Schwarzschild, became director of the observatory. In only a few years of work (by 1916 he had died from a chronic illness) he had made fundamental contributions in astrophysics and to General Relativity Theory. Only a few weeks after the theory's publication by Einstein, Schwarzschild found the first solution of the Einstein equations, which is now named after him as the "Schwarzschild solution" and which is of fundamental importance for the theory of black holes.

There exist further close links between the AOP and Einstein's Relativity Theory. In 1881 Albert A. Michelson first performed his interferometer experiments in the cellar of the main building of the AOP, that were to disprove the movement of the Earth through a hypothetical aether. His negative results were fundamentally reconciled only through Einstein's Special Relativity theory of 1905.

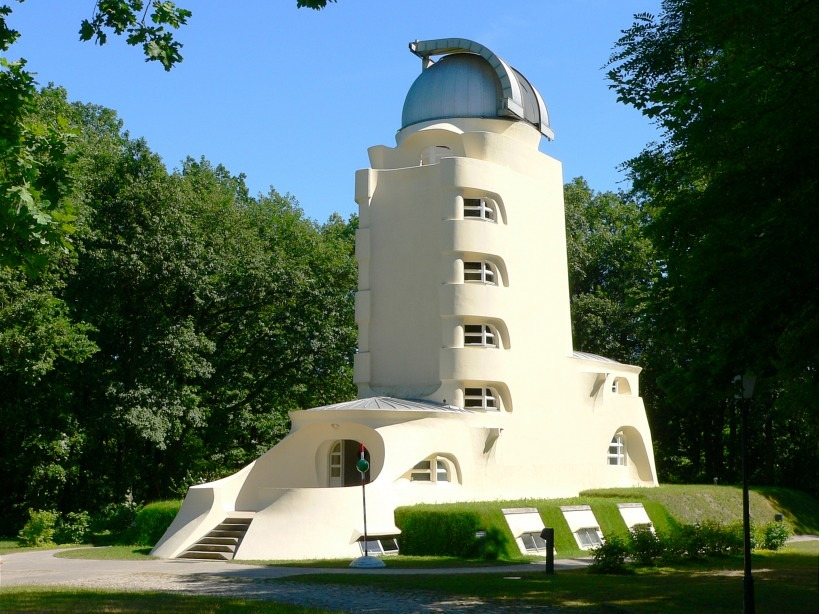
Einstein Tower at Telegrafenberg today. By Erich Mendelsohn

To prove the gravitational redshift of spectral lines of the Sun — an effect proposed by Einstein's theory of General Relativity — was the aim of a solar tower telescope, which was built from 1921 to 1924 at the instigation of Erwin Finlay-Freundlich. Though at that time it was not yet technically possible to measure the gravitational redshift, important developments in solar and plasma physics were started here and the architect, Erich Mendelsohn, created with this peculiarly expressionistic tower a unique scientific building.

Besides the work of Schwarzschild, in the following decades important observational programmes such as the Potsdamer Photometrische Durchmusterung and the outstanding investigations of Walter Grotrian on the solar corona found recognition all over the world.

=== Relocation of the Berlin Observatory to Babelsberg ===
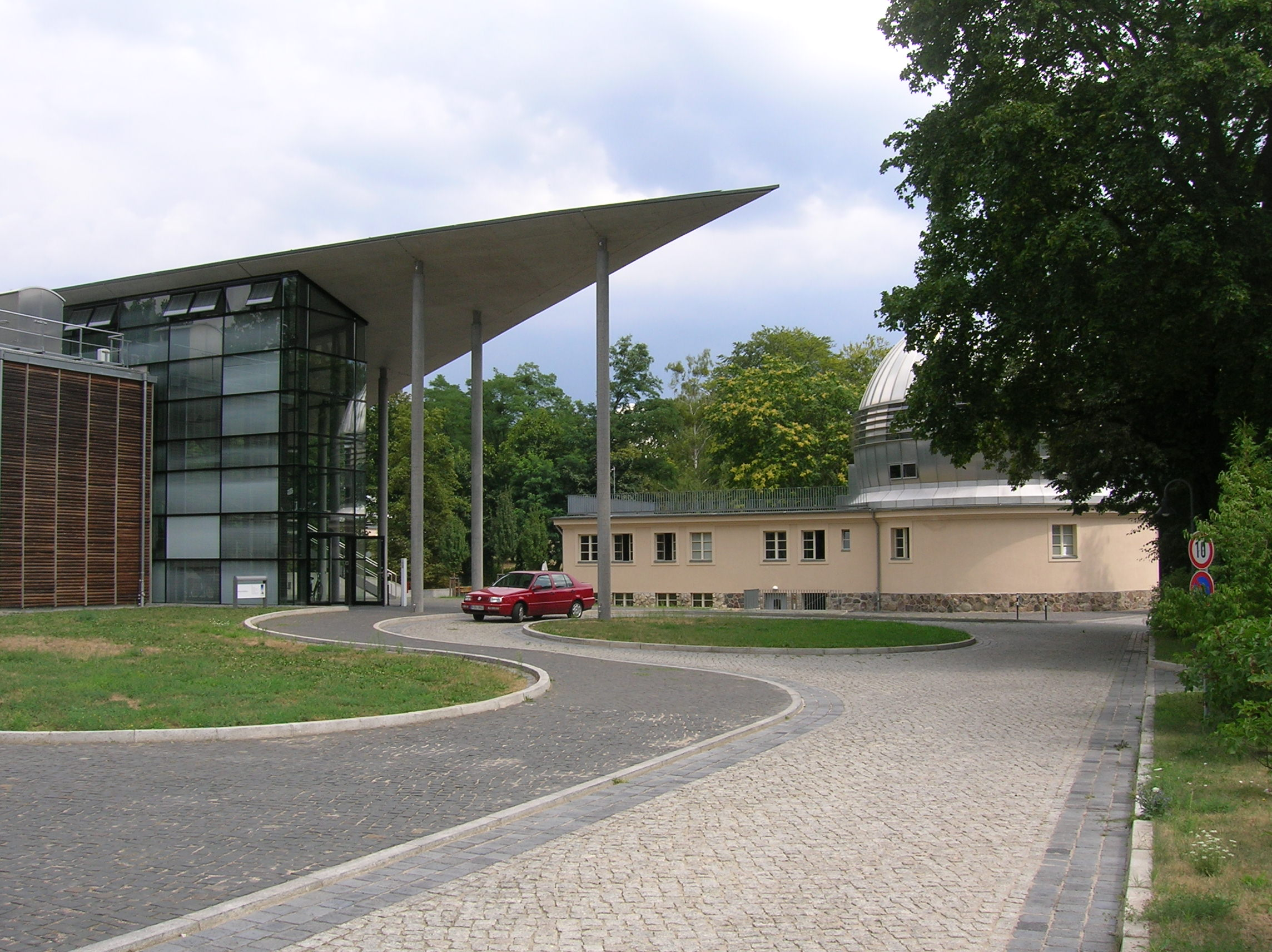
Institute buildings in Babelsberg

At the end of the 19th century the Berlin Observatory, originally built outside the border of the town, was enclosed by blocks of flats, so scientific observations were almost impossible. Therefore, Foerster proposed the removal of the observatory to a place outside Berlin with better observational conditions. In 1904 he appointed Karl Hermann Struve, former director of the observatory of Königsberg, as his successor to realize this project.

After test observations by Paul Guthnick in the summer of 1906 a new site was found on a hill in the eastern part of the Royal Park of Babelsberg. The ground was placed at the observatory's disposal by the crown free of charge. The costs of the new buildings and the new instruments amounted to 1.5 million Goldmark and could be covered by selling the landed property of the Berlin Observatory. The old observatory built by Schinkel was pulled down later. In June 1911 the construction of a new observatory began in Babelsberg and on 2 August 1913 the removal from Berlin to Babelsberg was complete.

The first new instruments were delivered in the spring of 1914. The 65 cm refractor — the first big astronomical instrument manufactured by the famous enterprise of Carl Zeiss Jena — was mounted in 1915, whereas the completion of the 122 cm reflector telescope was delayed until 1924 by the First World War. Struve died in 1920 from an accident, and his successor was Paul Guthnick, who introduced in 1913 photoelectric photometry into astronomy as the first objective method of measuring the brightness of stars. When the 122 cm telescope (at this time the second largest in the world) was finished, the Babelsberg Observatory was the best-equipped observatory of Europe.

The development of the photoelectric method for investigating weakly variable stars and spectroscopic investigations with the 122 cm telescope made the Babelsberg observatory well-known beyond Europe, too.

At the beginning of 1931 the Sonneberg Observatory founded by Cuno Hoffmeister was attached to the Babelsberg Observatory. For more than 60 years a photographic sky survey was carried out, which represents the second largest archive of astronomical photographic plates. This archive and the discovery and investigation of variable stars popularized the name Sonneberg all over the astronomical world.

With the beginning of the fascist regime, the fortunes of astronomy in Potsdam as well as in Babelsberg started to decline. The banishment of Jewish co-workers played an essential role in this process. The beginning of the Second World War practically marked the cessation of astronomical research.

=== Developments after the Second World War ===
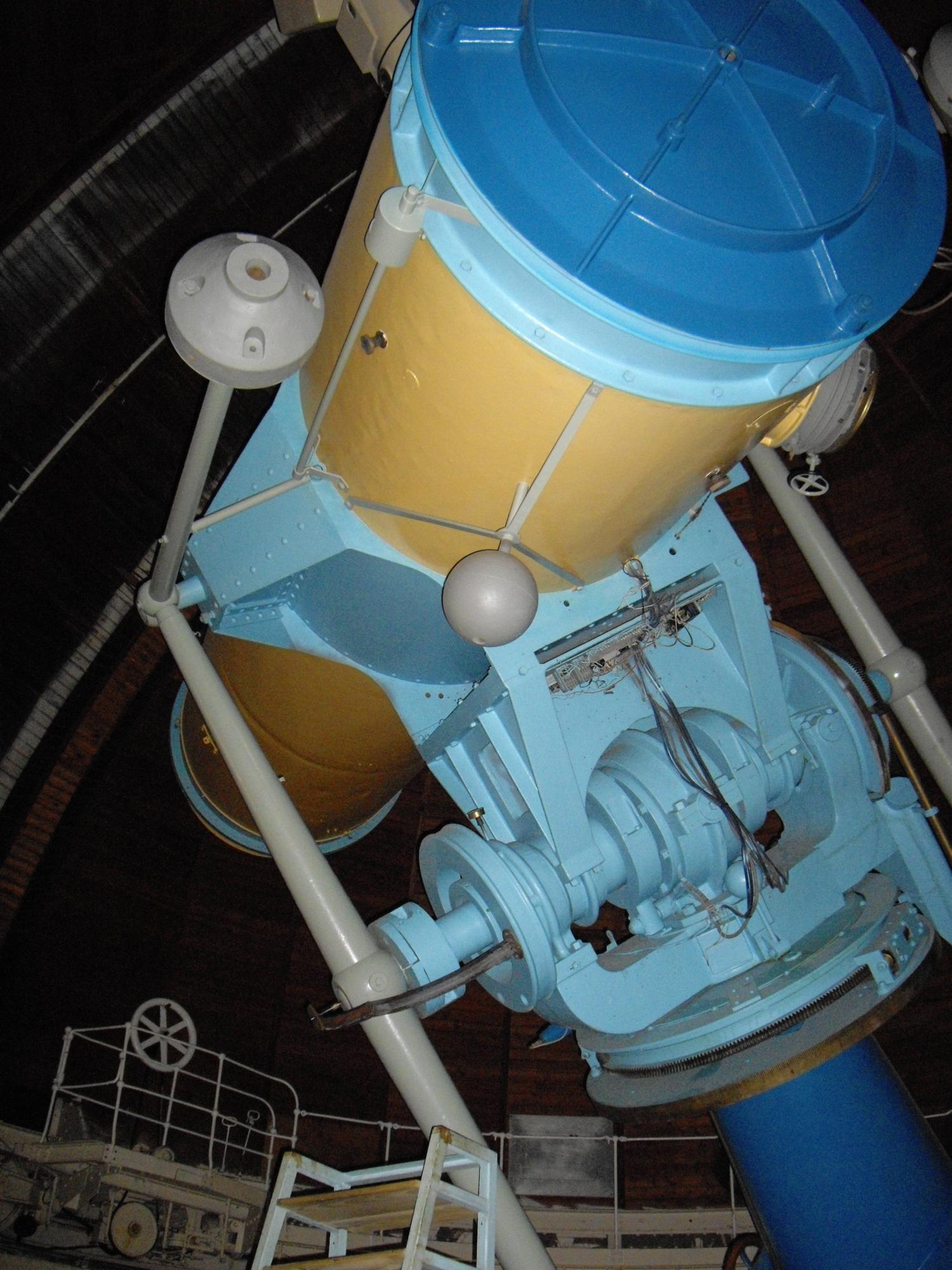
The 122 cm Babelsberg telescope in CrAO.

The new start after the war was very difficult. In Potsdam the Einstein Tower had suffered heavy damage by bombs, in Babelsberg valuable instruments, among them the 122 cm telescope (whose former building now houses the AIP library), were dismounted and removed to the Soviet Union as war reparations. Now the 122 cm telescope works in the Crimean Astrophysical Observatory.

In January 1947 the German Academy of Sciences took the AOP and the Babelsberg Observatory under its administration, but it was not until the beginning of the 1950s before astronomical research started anew.

AOP director Hans Kienle took over the editorial duties of the professional journal Astronomical Notes (German: Astronomische Nachrichten), which is to this day edited at the AIP and moreover the oldest professional journal for astronomy.

In June 1954 the Observatory for Solar Radio Astronomy (OSRA) in Tremsdorf (17 km southeast of Potsdam) began its work as a part of the AOP. Its history started in 1896: after the discovery of the radio waves by Heinrich Hertz in 1888, Johannes Wilsing and Julius Scheiner, fellows of the AOP, tried to detect radio emission from the Sun. They did not succeed, because of the low sensitivity of their equipment. After the Second World War Herbert Daene started once again to attempt radio observations of the Sun in Babelsberg which were continued in Tremsdorf.

In October 1960 the 2 m telescope built by Carl Zeiss Jena was inaugurated in the Tautenburg Forest near Jena and the new Karl Schwarzschild Observatory was founded. The Schmidt variant of this telescope is to this day the largest astronomical wide-field camera in the world and it was the main observational instrument of the astronomers of the GDR.

In 1969 the four East-German astronomical institutes, Astrophysical Observatory Potsdam, Babelsberg Observatory, the Thuringian Sonneberg Observatory, and Karl Schwarzschild Observatory Tautenburg, were joined in the course of academy reform to the Central Institute of Astrophysics of the Academy of Sciences of the GDR. The solar observatory Einstein Tower and Observatory for Solar Radio Astronomy were affiliated later.

One part of the scientific activities concerned cosmic magnetic fields and cosmic dynamos, phenomena of turbulence, magnetic and eruptive processes on the Sun, explosive energy dissipation processes in plasmas, variable stars and stellar activity. Another part was directed to the early phases of cosmic evolution and the origin of structures in the Universe, large-scale structures up to those of superclusters and to active galaxies. In this connection special methods of image processing have been developed. In addition, investigations in astrometry have also been performed.

The scientific work of the Central Institute for Astrophysics suffered strongly from the isolation of the GDR from the western world. It was very difficult to come into contact with western colleagues. After the autumn 1989 fall of the Berlin Wall, new possibilities at once arose.

=== Reunification and the founding of the AIP ===
On the basis of the prescriptions of the Unification Agreement for the Academy of Sciences of the GDR, the Central Institute of Astrophysics was dissolved on 31 December 1991. On the recommendation of the Science Council on 1 January 1992 the Astrophysical Institute Potsdam, with a greatly reduced staff, was founded. It occupies the former Babelsberg Observatory site in Potsdam-Babelsberg.

The Sonneberg Observatory and the Karl Schwarzschild Observatory are no longer affiliated with the AIP, but the AIP still operates the Observatory for Solar Rado Astronomy (OSRA) in Tremsdorf and maintains the Great Refractor and Einstein Tower at Telegrafenberg.

Since then, the AIP has broadened its research areas, initiated several new technical projects, and participates in several large international research projects (see below).

On 15 April 2011, the name of the AIP was changed to "Leibniz Institute for Astrophysics Potsdam", to emphasize the affiliation of the institute with the Leibniz Association. The institute retains the abbreviation "AIP", as well as the "aip.de" Internet domain.

== Main research areas ==
- Magnetohydrodynamics (MHD): Magnetic fields and turbulence in stars, accretion disks and galaxies; computer simulations ao dynamos, magnetic instabilities and magnetic convection
- Solar physics: Observation of sunspots and of solar magnetic field with spectro-polarimetry; Helioseismology and hydrodynamic numerical models; Study of coronal plasma processes by means of radio astronomy; Operation of the Observatory for Solar Radio Astronomy (OSRA) in Tremsdorf, with four radio antennas in different frequency bands from 40 MHz to 800 MHz
- Stellar physics: Numerical simulations of convection in stellar atmospheres, determination of stellar surface parameters and chemical abundances, winds and dust shells of red giants; Doppler tomography of stellar surface structures, development of robotic telescopes, as well as simulation of magnetic flux tubes
- Star formation and the interstellar medium: Brown dwarfs and low-mass stars, circumstellar disks, Origin of double and multiple-star systems
- Galaxies and quasars: Mother galaxies and surroundings of quasars, development of quasars and active galactic cores, structure and the story of the origin of the Milky Way, numerical computer simulations of the origin and development of galaxies
- Cosmology: Numerical simulation of the formation of large-scale structures. Semi-analytic models of galaxy formation and evolution. Predictions for future large observational surveys.

== Participation in large international research projects ==
=== Large Binocular Telescope ===
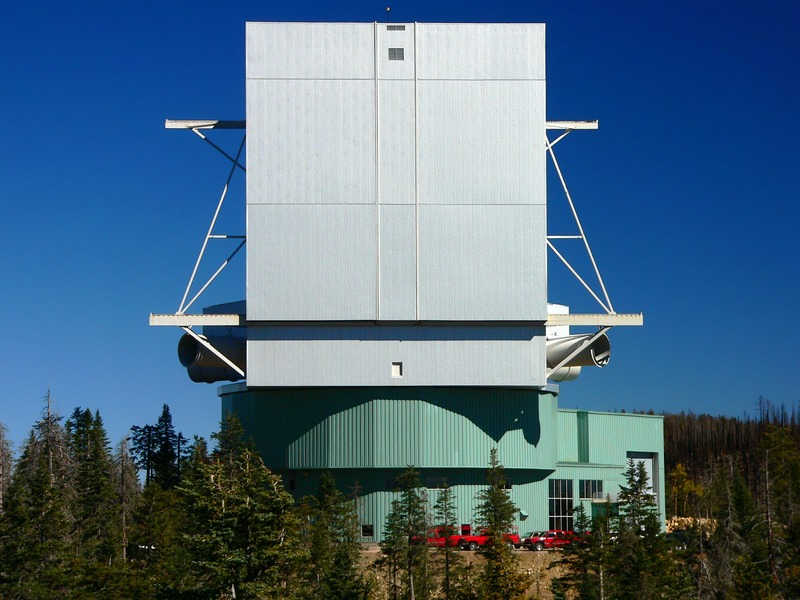
Large Binocular Telescope in Arizona

The Large Binocular Telescope (LBT) is a new telescope on Mt. Grahams in Arizona. The LBT consists of 2 huge 8.4 m telescopes on a common mount. With their 110 square meter area, the LBT is the largest telescope in the world on a single mount, only surpassed by the combined VLTs and Kecks.

=== RAVE ===
The Radial Velocity Experiment measures until 2010 the radial velocities and elemental abundances of a million stars, predominantly in the southern celestial hemisphere. The 6dF multi-object spectrograph on the 1.2 m UK Schmidt telescope of the Anglo-Australian Observatory will be applied for this purpose.

=== Sloan Digital Sky Survey ===
The Sloan Digital Sky Survey (SDSS) will investigate in detail a quarter of the whole sky and determine the position and absolute brightness of more than 100 million sky objects. Besides that, the distances of more than a million galaxies and quasars will be estimated. With the help of this study, astronomers will be able to assess the distribution of large-scale structures in the Universe. This can provide hints about the story of the development of the Universe.

=== LOFAR (LOw Frequency ARray) ===
LOFAR is a European radio interferometer, that measures radio waves with many individual antennas in different places which it combines to a single signal. One of these international LOFAR stations has been constructed in Bornim by Potsdam and is being operated by the AIP.

=== Solar Orbiter ===
Solar Orbiter is an international mission led by the European Space Agency (ESA), with participation from NASA. It was launched on 10 February 2020, and it will observe the Sun for at least seven years. The scientific payload consists of 10 instruments: four in-situ instruments that measure the physical conditions (magnetic field, radio waves, energetic particles...) at the location of the spacecraft, and six remote sensing instruments that observe the Sun and its corona in various wavelength ranges. The AIP is involved in the operations and scientific exploitation of two instruments: the Spectrometer Telescope for Imaging X-rays (STIX), and the Energetic Particle Detector (EPD).

== Technical projects ==
=== Virtual observatory ===
The German Astrophysical Virtual Observatory (GAVO) is an e-Science project, that creates a virtual observation platform to support modern astrophysical research in Germany. It is the German contribution to international efforts to establish a general Virtual Observatory. GAVO enables standardized access to German and international data archives.

=== GREGOR ===
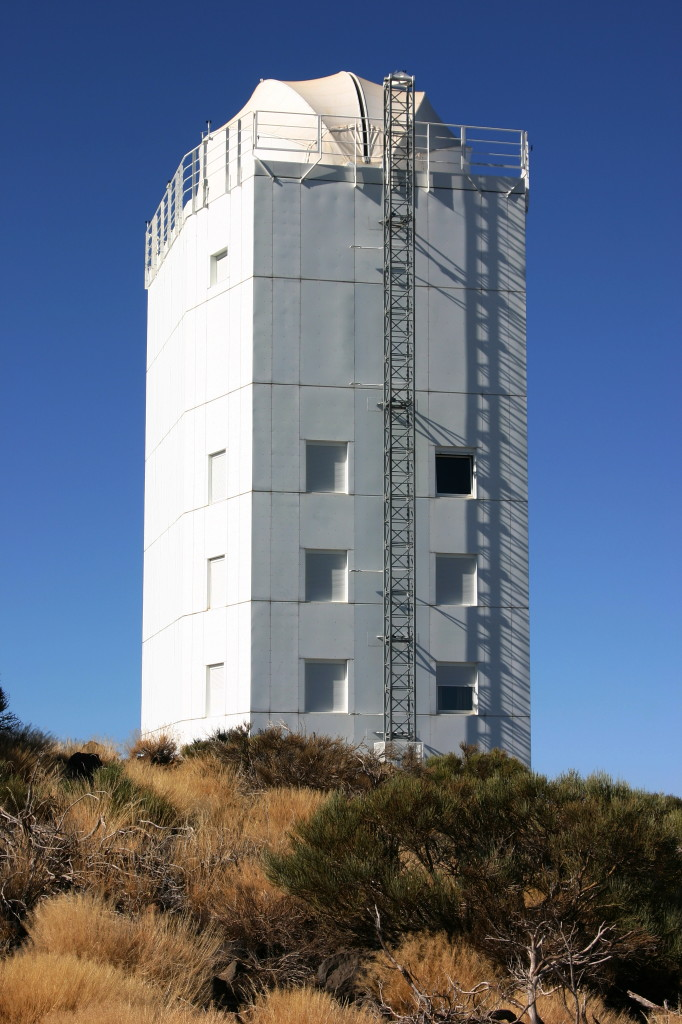
Solar telescope GREGOR

GREGOR is a 1.5 m telescope for solar research of the Teide Observatory on Tenerife. It is a new type of solar telescope, which supersedes the previous 45 cm Gregory-Coudé telescope. GREGOR is equipped with adaptive optics and will achieve a resolution of 70 km of the Sun's surface. The investigation of these small structures is important for the understanding of the underlying processes of the interaction of magnetic fields with plasma turbulence on the Sun. The development of the Gregor telescope will be led by the Kiepenheuer-Institut für Sonnenphysik (KIS) with the participation of several institutes. The telescope is named after James Gregory, the inventor of the Gregorian telescope.

=== AGWs of the Large Binocular Telescope ===
The AIP is a partner in the LBT Consortium (LBTC) and contributes financially and materially in the construction of the Large Binocular Telescope. This entails both the development and the fabrication of the optics and the mechanical and electronic components as well as the development of the software for the acquisition, guiding and wavefront sensing units (AGWs). The AGW units are essential components of the telescope and indispensable for the adaptive optics.

=== Multi Unit Spectroscopic Explorer (MUSE) ===
The Multi Unit Spectroscopic Explorer (MUSE) is an instrument of the second generation for the VLT of the ESO. MUSE is optimized for the observation of normal galaxies out to very high redshift. It will furthermore deliver detailed studies of nearby normal, interacting, and starburst galaxies.

=== Potsdam Echelle Polarimetric & Spectroscopic Instrument (PEPSI) ===
PEPSI is a high-resolution spectrograph for the LBT. It will enable the simultaneous observation of circularly and linearly polarized light with high spectral and temporal resolution. The spectrograph is situated in a temperature- and pressure-stabilized room within the telescope column. The light will be conducted by fiber optics from the telescope to the spectrograph.

=== STELLA ===
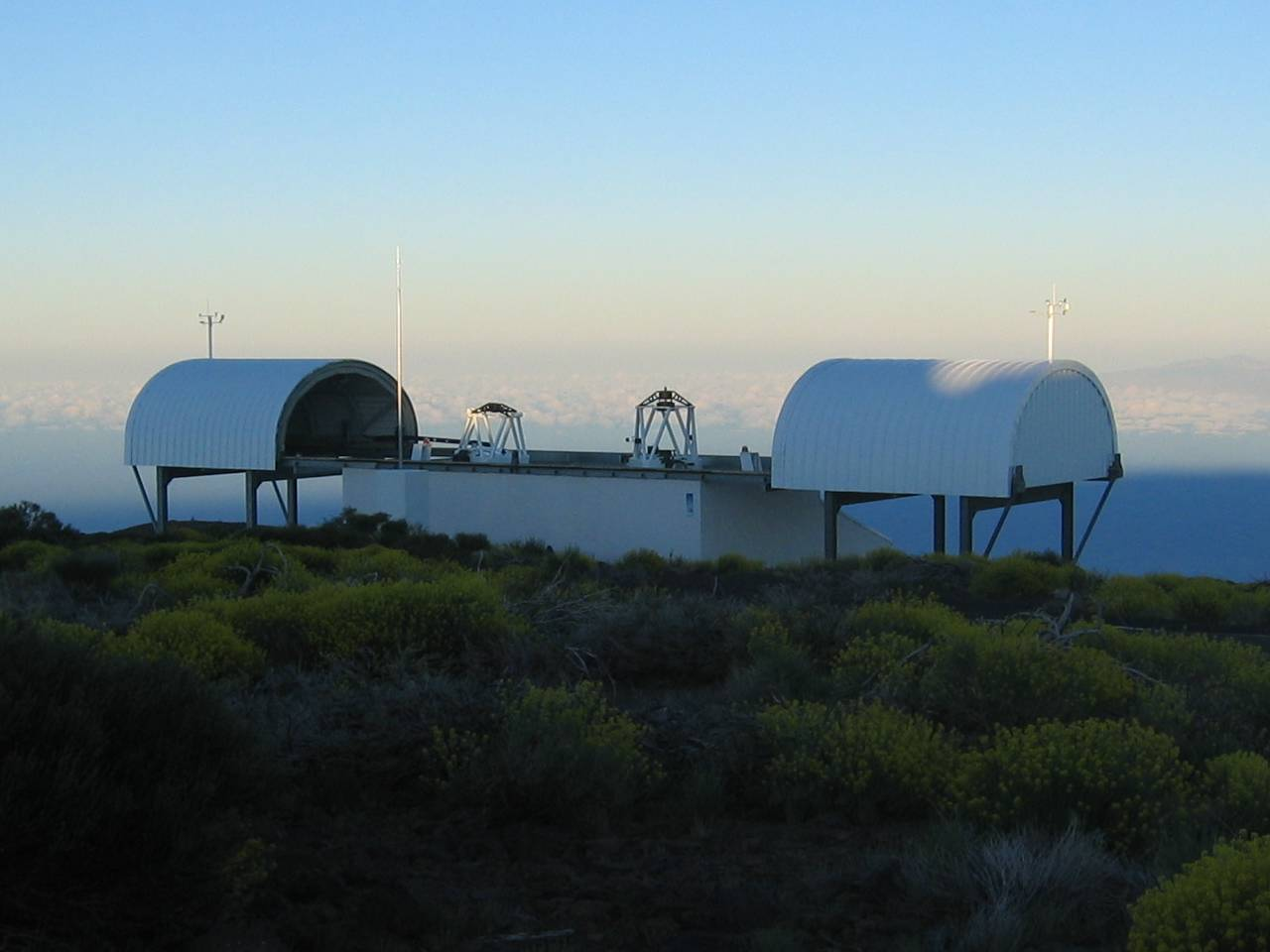
STELLA Robotic Observatory on Tenerife

STELLA is a robotic observatory that consists of two 1.2 m telescopes. It is a long-term project to observe indicators of stellar activity of Sun-like stars. The operation occurs unattended — the telescopes decide the appropriate observation strategy automatically.

=== Observatory for Solar Radio Astronomy (OSRA) ===
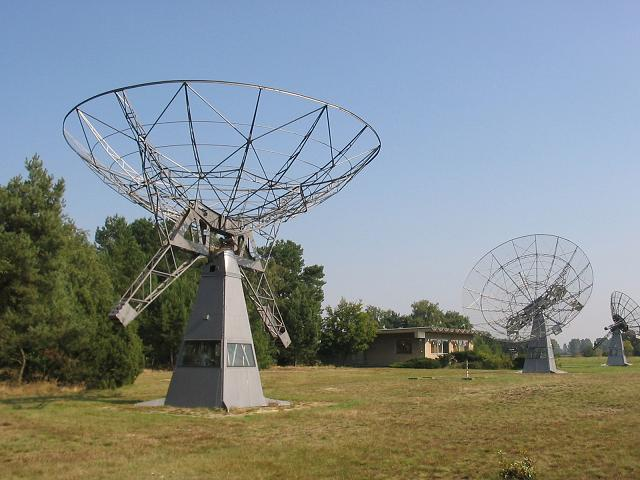
OSRA Radio Antenna in Tremsdorf

The radio observatory OSRA has been observing and recording radio emission from the Sun's corona every day from 1990 until 2007. It was composed of four antennas, observing in four different frequency bands: 40–80 MHz, 100–170 MHz, 200–400 MHz and 400–800 MHz. The antennas were robotised to follow the Sun automatically. The observatory was located in Tremsdorf, near Potsdam.

=== 4-metre Multi-Object Spectroscopic Telescope (4MOST) ===
4MOST is a multi-fiber, multi-spectrograph instrument that shall replace VIRCAM at the 4 m VISTA (telescope) and perform a 5-year survey of both galactic and extra-galactic targets. Whereas the hardware has been designed and built by an international team of collaborators, the instrument is being assembled and tested at AIP. Contrary to most ESO projects, it shall be jointly operated by both ESO and the scientific consortium, with project management continuing to be hosted at AIP.

== Telescopes and collaborations ==
- 4MOST
- Einstein Tower solar telescope
- Great Refractor at Telegrafenberg
- GREGOR solar telescope, collaboration with KIS
- Large Binocular Telescope
- Meridian Circle
- OSRA Solar Radio Observatory in Tremsdorf
- RoboTel robotic telescope
- STELLA robotic telescope
- Vacuum Tower Telescope VTT, collaboration with KIS
- Zeiss 70 cm reflector telescope
- Zeiss 50 cm reflector telescope
- Zeiss refractor telescope

== See also ==
- List of astronomical societies
