= Einstein Tower =

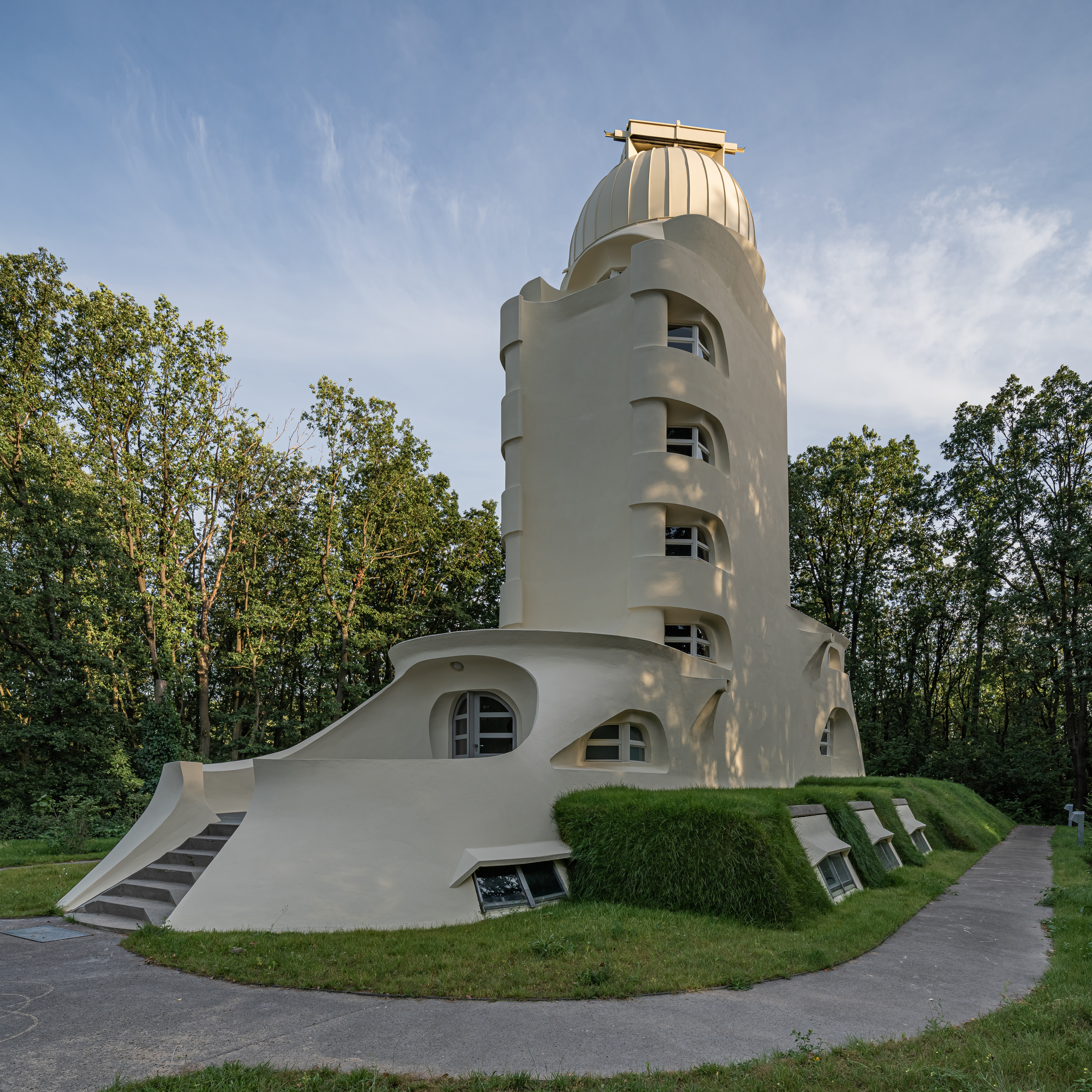
- The Einsteinturm in Potsdam, Germany
- Named after: Albert Einstein
- Organization: Leibniz Institute for Astrophysics Potsdam
- Observatory code: 042
- Location: Telegrafenberg, Teltower Vorstadt, Potsdam-Süd, Germany
- Coordinates: 52°22′44″N 13°03′49″E
- Established: 1924
- Website: www.aip.de/de/forschung/forschungsschwerpunkt-kmf/cosmic-magnetic-fields/sonnenphysik/optische-sonnenphysik/einsteinturm,%20https://www.aip.de/en/institute/locations/einstein-tower/
- Location of Einstein Tower
- Related media on Commons

The Einstein Tower (German: Einsteinturm) is an astrophysical observatory in the Albert Einstein Science Park in Potsdam, Germany. The Tower was built by architect Erich Mendelsohn in 1924.

It was built on the summit of the Potsdam Telegraphenberg to house a solar telescope designed by the astronomer Erwin Finlay-Freundlich. The telescope supports experiments and observations to validate (or disprove) Albert Einstein's relativity theory.

Although Einstein never worked there, he supported the construction and operation of the telescope.

Einstein Tower is a working solar observatory today as part of the Leibniz Institute for Astrophysics Potsdam.

== History ==
The building was first conceived around 1917, built from 1919 to 1921 after a fund-raising drive, and became operational in 1924. Light from the telescope is directed down through the shaft to the basement where the instruments and laboratory are located. There were more than half a dozen telescopes in the laboratory.

This was one of Mendelsohn's first major projects, completed when a young Richard Neutra was on his staff, and is his best-known building. Between 1917 and 1920 Mendelsohn created numerous sketches with the attempt to create a structure that reflects Einstein's groundbreaking theories.

The exterior was originally conceived in concrete, but due to construction difficulties with the complex design and shortages from the war, much of the building was actually realized in brick, covered with stucco. Because the material was changed during construction of the building, the designs were not updated to accommodate them. This caused many problems, such as cracking and dampness. Extensive repair work had to be done only five years after the initial construction, overseen by Mendelsohn himself. Since then numerous renovations have been done periodically.

The building was heavily damaged by Allied bombing during World War II, leaving it in a state that, as the architecture blog A456 noted, was ironically more in line with Mendelsohn's conceptual sketches than the pre-war structure was. It underwent a full renovation in 1999, for its 75th anniversary, to correct problems with dampness and decay that had meant decades of repair. It is often cited as one of the landmarks of expressionist architecture.

According to lore, Mendelsohn took Einstein on a long tour of the completed structure, waiting for some sign of approval. The design, while logical and perfectly sufficient to its purpose, stood out like an "ungainly spaceship" in the suburbs of Potsdam. Einstein said nothing until hours later, during a meeting with the building committee, when he whispered his one-word judgment: "Organic". Mendelsohn himself said that he had designed it out of some unknown urge, letting it emerge from "the mystique around Einstein's universe".

== Research ==
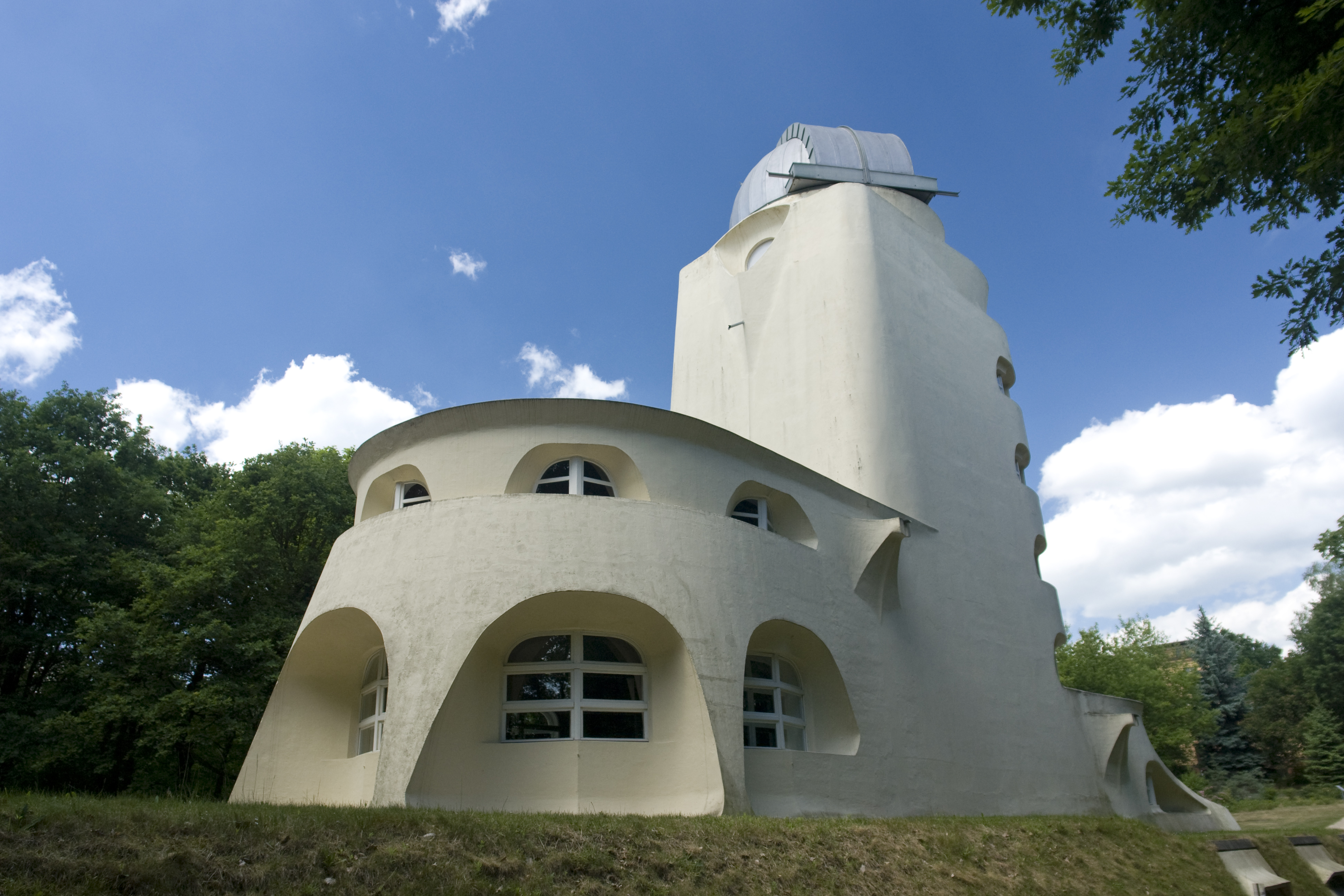
A rear view of Erich Mendelsohn's Einstein Tower

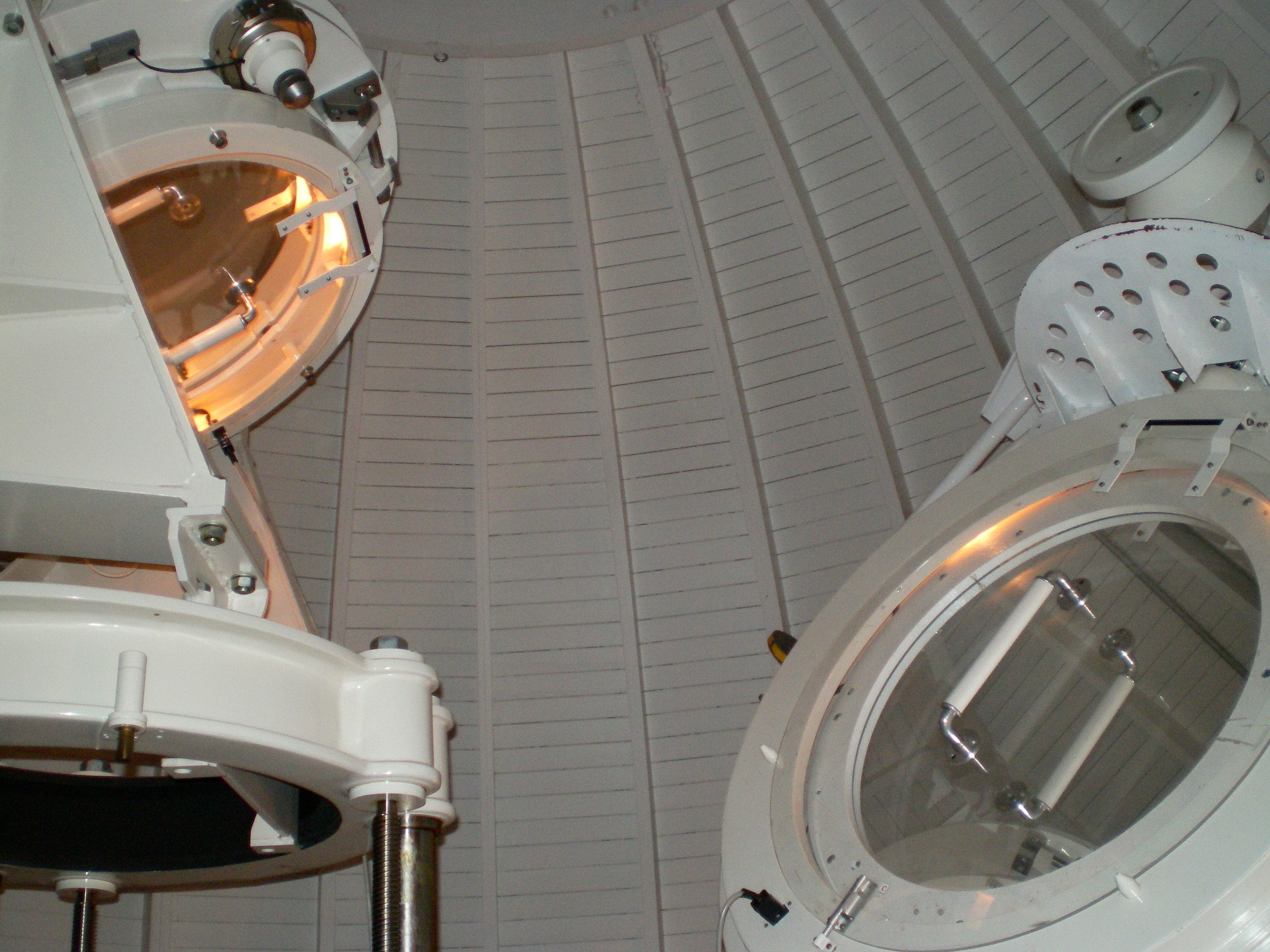
Zeiss-type Coelostat in the dome of the Einstein Tower. On the right is the heliostat. On the left, a mirror which reflects the beam of light down the tower. The mirrors were covered with protection caps when the photo was taken.

=== Equipment and initial research focus ===
In 1911 Einstein published the initial version of his innovative General Theory of Relativity. One of the predicted effects according to the theory was a slight shift of spectral lines in the sun's gravitation field, now known as the red shift. The solar observatory in Potsdam was designed and constructed primarily to verify this phenomenon.

The Mount Wilson Observatory in California, the first tower telescope worldwide, was the model for the facility designed by Freundlich. In tower telescopes a coelostat (a system with two deflecting mirrors, pronounced "seelostat") at the top of a vertical construction directs light down to an objective. The actual lens system is rigidly integrated into the construction. The mirrors at the top are movable and only these small lightweight instrument components are needed to track the sun. Because of the vertical arrangement, air turbulence near the ground has virtually no effect.

In the Einstein Tower the construction containing the optics consists of two wooden platforms, each six m high, placed one above the other. The telescope has a lens objective of 60 cm diameter and focal length of 14 m. Rooms for observations and measurements are located at the base of the tower. In California the lab rooms are under each other; in Potsdam they are arranged horizontally. Another rotating mirror directs the sunlight to the spectrograph lab located in the basement behind an earthen wall on the southern side of the tower. It is about 14 m long and thermally insulated. Here is where the light is split up into its spectral components and analyzed. This design of a horizontal laboratory wing led to the elongated profile of the entire facility.

Soon after research started at the site, it became evident that the proof sought would be harder to obtain than originally anticipated since the minimal shift of spectral lines was obscured by other solar influences. The reason was atmospheric turbulence on the solar surface. However, Einstein and Freundlich had from the beginning not only been interested in the specific problem of the red shift, but had also intended basic research in solar physics, and the laboratories were so designed that new equipment could be installed without difficulty. The turbulent behavior of the outer solar atmosphere soon became the primary subject of research at the Einstein Tower. The red shift could be proved only in the 1950s after it became possible to precisely analyze the complex disturbances of the solar atmosphere.

=== Present work ===
The characteristics and behavior of magnetic fields provide the key to understanding solar activity and are at the focus of work at the Einstein Tower. The solar magnetic field can be measured with the help of a double spectrograph and two photoelectric polarization analyzers. Measurements in the photosphere, the visible light realm, permit conclusions about the situation at higher altitude levels. The Potsdam astronomers participate in the operation of an observatory on Tenerife. Instruments to be used there are first developed and tested at the Einstein Tower. The Einstein Tower also plays an important role in training students.

== Architecture and main sights ==
According to Mendelsohn's ideas, the tower should be created as a sculptural architecture made of reinforced concrete. In fact, it was built using a mixed construction method: parts of the main structure, the stairs in the tower and its end below the dome were cast from concrete. The base, the roofs over the extensions and the tower itself were made of bricks. The rotating dome is a wooden structure.

To create a uniform appearance, the building was then covered with cement spray plaster. It is one of the most famous examples of expressionist architecture in Germany.

=== Einstein Sculpture ===
In the tower's entrance area there is a bronze bust of Einstein which was originally located in one of the rooms of the observatory. After the Nazis' anti-Semitic dictatorship began in 1933, the Einstein Tower lost its name and status as an independent institute. Pictures of Einstein were removed and sculptures were supposedly melted down. However, after 1945 it was discovered that staff members had rescued the portrait bust now to be seen at the base of the tower by hiding it behind crates in the spectrograph lab. As a hidden homage to Einstein a single stone (German: 'ein Stein') was placed where the bust had stood, a tradition that is still kept (the stone is regularly stolen or moved and has to be replaced).

=== The 3 SEC Bronze Brain ===
A few meters in front of the stairs to the Einstein Tower and set into the pavement of the forecourt is a fist-sized art object, a bronze reproduction of a human brain highly reduced in size, its shiny surface a sign of wear, inscribed with the four characters, 3 SEC. It was created by the Berlin artist Volker März, who placed it here and in an identical form in front of the Neurological Institute of the Charité in Berlin. The small sculpture refers to a scientific thesis of Ernst Pöppel according to which "the experience of continuity is based on an illusion. Continuity arises through the networking of contents, which in each case are represented in a time window of three seconds. We reconstruct temporal continuity based on what is represented in the individual islands of consciousness" (translation). Taking up this idea, März titled his work "the 3 SEC Bronze Brain – Admonition to the Now – Monument to the continuous present" (translation).

=== Digital Exhibition ===
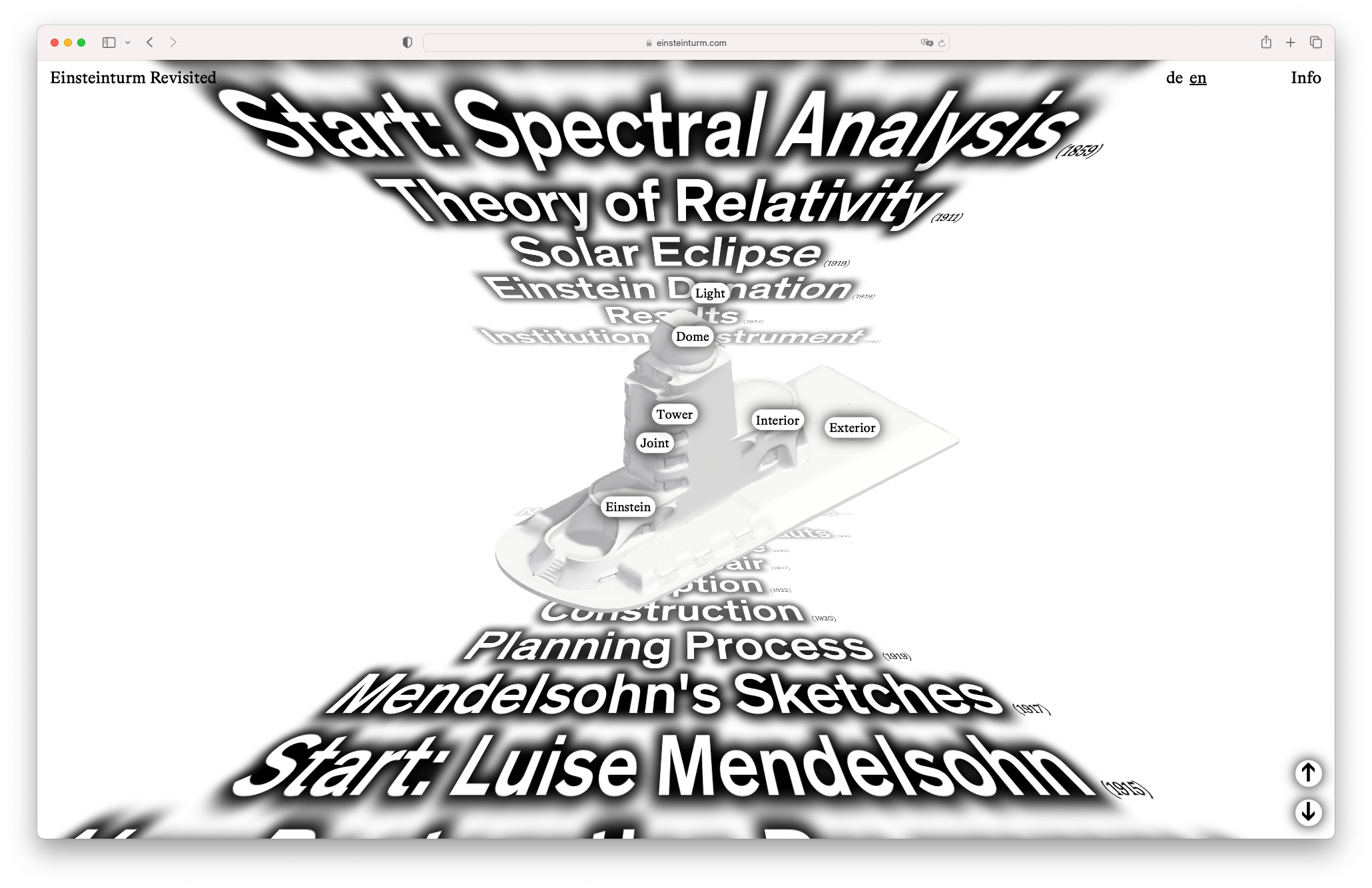
Landing Page of the digital exhibition on Einstein Tower

With the newest refurbishment of the Einstein Tower, a sign in front was unveiled with an access to the digital exhibition Einsteinturm revisited. The exhibition shows how the Einstein Tower was conceived both scientifically and architecturally, and explains, why it needs to be refurbished on a regular basis.

== See also ==
- List of solar telescopes

== Sources ==
- Klaus Hentschel: The Einstein Tower An Intertexture of Dynamic Construction, Relativity Theory, and Astronomy, Stanford University Press, Stanford 1997.
- Paul Sigel, Silke Dähmlow, Frank Seehausen and Lucas Elmenhorst: Architekturführer Potsdam - Architectural Guide, Dietrich Reimer Verlag, Berlin 2006, ISBN 3-496-01325-7.
- Wolfschmidt, Gudrun; Cotte, Michel (2010). "Case Study 12.5: The Einstein Tower, Potsdam, Germany". In Ruggles, Clive; Cotte, Michel (eds.). Heritage Sites of Astronomy and Archaeoastronomy in the context of the UNESCO World Heritage Convention: A Thematic Study (PDF). Paris: ICOMOS and International Astronomical Union. pp. 209–212. ISBN 978-2-918086-01-7.
- Vaughan Hart, 'Erich Mendelsohn and the Fourth Dimension', ARQ, 2.1, 1995, pp. 50–59
