= USS Mintaka =

Cargo ship of the United States Navy

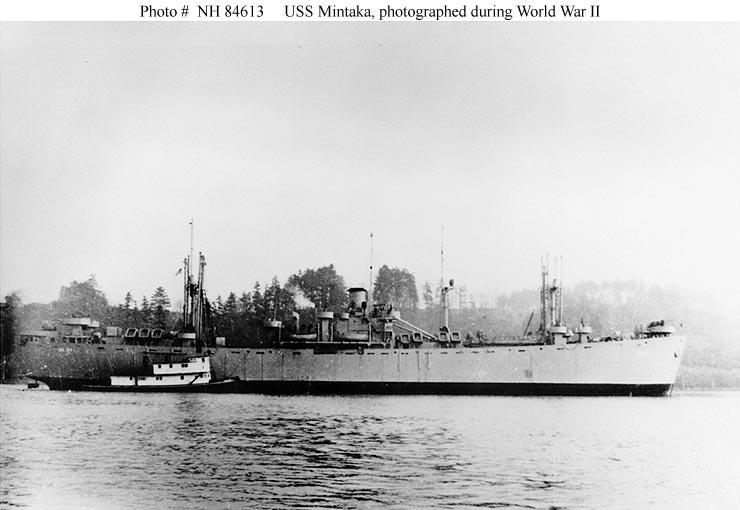
- USS Mintaka (AK-94), underway during World War II, with a tug alongside.

History

United States
- Name: Ansel Briggs; Mintaka
- Namesake: Ansel Briggs; Mintaka
- Operator: United States Coast Guard
- Ordered: as a Type EC2-S-C1 hull, MCE hull 725
- Builder: California Shipbuilding Corporation, Terminal Island, Los Angeles, California
- Cost: $966,012
- Yard number: 150
- Way number: 2
- Laid down: 9 February 1943
- Launched: 10 March 1943
- Sponsored by: Mrs. A.V. Bechtel
- Acquired: 26 March 1943
- Commissioned: 10 May 1943
- Decommissioned: 12 February 1946
- Renamed: Mintaka, 17 March 1943
- Stricken: 26 February 1946
- Identification: Hull symbol: AK-94; Code letters: NKGP
- Honors and awards: 1 × battle star
- Fate: Returned to MARCOM, laid up in the National Defense Reserve Fleet, Suisun Bay, California, 12 February 1946; Sold for scrapping, 6 March 1968, withdrawn from fleet, 18 March 1968, scrapping complete, 20 November 1968

General characteristics
- Class & type: Crater-class cargo ship
- Type: Type EC2-S-C1
- Displacement: 4,023 long tons (4,088 t) (standard); 14,550 long tons (14,780 t) (full load)
- Length: 441 ft 6 in (134.57 m)
- Beam: 56 ft 11 in (17.35 m)
- Draft: 28 ft 4 in (8.64 m)
- Installed power: 2 × Oil fired 450 °F (232 °C) boilers, operating at 220 psi (1,500 kPa) , (manufactured by Western Pipe and Steel Company); 2,500 shp (1,900 kW)
- Propulsion: 1 × Vertical triple-expansion reciprocating steam engine, (manufactured by Joshua Hendy); 1 × screw propeller
- Speed: 12.5 kn (23.2 km/h; 14.4 mph)
- Capacity: 7,800 t (7,700 long tons) DWT; 444,206 cu ft (12,578.5 m^{3}) (non-refrigerated)
- Complement: 206
- Armament: 1 × 5 in (127 mm)/38 caliber dual purpose (DP); 4 × 3 in (76 mm)/50 caliber DP gun; 4 × 40 mm (1.57 in) Bofors anti-aircraft (AA) gun mounts; 6 × 20 mm (0.79 in) Oerlikon cannons AA gun mounts

USS Mintaka (AK-94) was a Crater-class cargo ship commissioned by the US Navy for service in World War II. She was named after Mintaka, a star in the Orion constellation. Mintaka was crewed by United States Coast Guard personnel and was responsible for delivering troops, goods and equipment to locations in the Asiatic-Pacific Theater.

== Construction ==
Mintaka was laid down 9 February 1943, under Maritime Commission (MARCOM) contract, MC hull 725, as Liberty ship SS Ansel Briggs by California Shipbuilding Corporation, Terminal Island, Los Angeles, California; launched 10 March 1943; sponsored by Mrs. A. V. Bechtel; renamed Mintaka 17 March 1943; delivered to the Navy 26 March 1943; and commissioned at San Diego, California, 10 May 1943.

== Service history ==
=== Cargo to New Zealand ===
Mintaka steamed to San Francisco late in the month and after loading cargo sailed for the South Pacific Ocean 15 June. Steaming via New Caledonia, she reached New Zealand 15 July, and discharged cargo at Auckland and Wellington before departing for the US West Coast 1 August.

=== Alaska cargo runs ===
She arrived San Francisco 23 August, thence steamed 11 September, for Seattle to prepare for supply runs in Alaskan waters. Departing Puget Sound 24 September, she touched at Dutch Harbor 11 October, and during the next month she shuttled cargo to American bases in the Aleutians.

=== Conversion to troop transport ===
After returning to Seattle, 27 November, she underwent conversion to a troopcarrying cargo ship at Portland, Oregon, early in December.

=== Transporting troops to the war zone ===
Mintaka sailed 11 January 1944, for San Francisco whence, after embarking 1,056 troops, she sailed 2 February, for the South Pacific. She reached Nouméa, New Caledonia, 23 February, and began troop and cargo shuttle runs among the islands of the South Pacific. Between 27 February and 10 March, she carried 1,800 troops to New Zealand and back: thence, she made a run to the New Hebrides before arriving Guadalcanal 9 April. During the next several months she maintained a busy schedule transporting fighting men and supplies to numerous American bases in Melanesia from the Admiralties to the Fijis. She carried thousands of troops to and from staging areas; on one run between the Green Islands and Guadalcanal in late May, she carried more than 1,500 soldiers.

Mintaka departed Guadalcanal 26 September; operated out of Manus, Admiralties, during much of October; and sailed in convoy 26 October, for shuttle duty in the Palaus. Between 31 October and 30 November, she operated from Kossol Passage south to Peleliu discharging troops and cargo. After embarking 994 veterans of the Palaus' campaign, she returned to Guadalcanal 10 December, and resumed shuttle runs among the Solomons and the Bismarck Archipelago. With 968 Seabees embarked, she departed Guadalcanal 26 April 1945, bound for Okinawa.

=== Delivering troops to Okinawa ===
Steaming in convoy via Eniwetok and Ulithi, Mintaka reached Okinawa 21 May, and began debarking troops and unloading cargo. Despite periodic Japanese air attacks, she continued off-loading operations during the next week. On 25 May, her gunners splashed an enemy plane during an assault which damaged a nearby merchant ship. Mintaka sailed 31 May, touched at Ulithi 6 June, Pearl Harbor 23 June, and arrived San Francisco 3 July.

=== End-of-war operations ===
After voyage repairs, Mintaka embarked 1,035 troop reinforcements and departed Portland, Oregon, 24 July. The cessation of hostilities found her at Eniwetok. On 20 August, she reached Saipan, Marianas, and began debarking troops. Subsequent troop and cargo runs during the remainder of the year carried her to Iwo Jima, Okinawa and Ulithi.

== Post-war decommissioning ==
She returned to San Francisco 30 December, decommissioned there 12 February 1946, and was redelivered to WSA the same day. Her name was struck the Navy List 26 February 1946.

Mintaka was laid up in the National Defense Reserve Fleet, Suisun Bay Group, Benicia, California, on 12 February 1946. On 6 March 1968, she was sold to Union Minerals & Alloys Corporation for scrapping. She was withdrawn from the fleet on 18 March 1968, and scrapping was completed on 20 November 1968.

== Awards ==

Mintaka received one battle star for World War II service. Her crew were eligible for the following medals:

- Combat Action Ribbon (retroactive, 25 May 1945)
- American Campaign Medal
- Asiatic–Pacific Campaign Medal (1)
- World War II Victory Medal
- Navy Occupation Service Medal (with Asia clasp)

== Bibliography ==
- "Mintaka". Dictionary of American Naval Fighting Ships. Naval History and Heritage Command.
- "California Shipbuilding, Los Angeles CA". Shipbuilding History. 13 October 2010.
- "USS Mintaka (AK-94)". NavSource. 13 June 2014.
- "ANSEL BRIGGS". United States Department of Transportation. Archived from the original on 12 December 2019.
- "SS Ansel Briggs".
