= Mintaka =

Five-star system in the constellation Orion

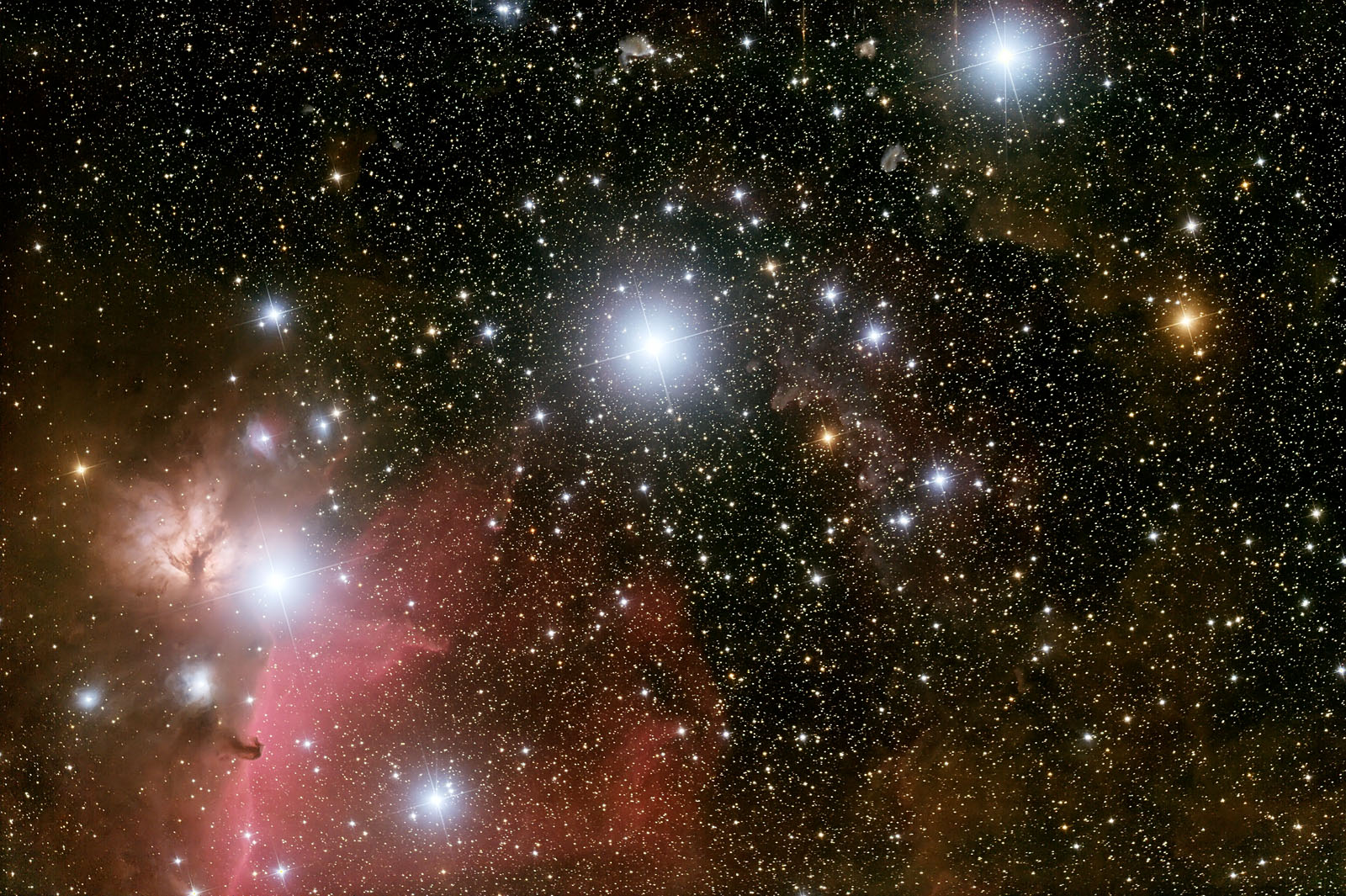
- Orion's Belt (composed of the three brightest stars shown), Mintaka being the rightmost, on the west side

Observation data Epoch J2000 Equinox ICRS
- Constellation: Orion
- δ Ori A
- Right ascension: 05^{h} 32^{m} 00.40009^{s}
- Declination: −00° 17′ 56.7424″
- Apparent magnitude (V): 2.23 (2.50 + 3.90)
- δ Ori C
- Right ascension: 05^{h} 32^{m} 00.406^{s}
- Declination: −00° 17′ 04.38″
- Apparent magnitude (V): 6.85

Characteristics

δ Ori A
- Spectral type: O9.5II + B1V +B0IV
- U−B color index: −1.05
- B−V color index: −0.22
- Variable type: Eclipsing binary

δ Ori C
- Spectral type: B3V + A0V
- U−B color index: −0.71
- B−V color index: −0.16

Astrometry
Radial velocity (R_{v})	18.50±0.5 km/s
Proper motion (μ)	RA: 0.64±0.56 mas/yr Dec.: −0.69±0.27 mas/yr
Parallax (π)	4.71±0.58 mas
Distance	1,245.9 ± 3.3 ly (382±1 pc)
Absolute magnitude (M_{V})	−5.8

δ Ori Aa1
Absolute magnitude (M_{V})	−5.4

δ Ori Aa2
Absolute magnitude (M_{V})	−2.9

δ Ori Ab
Absolute magnitude (M_{V})	−4.2

δ Ori C
Proper motion (μ)	RA: +1.523 mas/yr Dec.: −1.653 mas/yr
Parallax (π)	2.6245±0.0538 mas
Distance	1,240 ± 30 ly (381 ± 8 pc)

Orbit
Primary	δ Ori Aa1
Name	δ Ori Aa2
Period (P)	5.733121 days
Semi-major axis (a)	40.1 R_{☉}
Eccentricity (e)	0.081
Inclination (i)	79.124°
Longitude of the node (Ω)	224.294°
Periastron epoch (T)	2,456,295.674±0.062
Argument of periastron (ω) (primary)	43.451°

Orbit
Primary	δ Ori Aa1/2
Name	δ Ori Ab
Period (P)	53,839 days (147.4 yr)
Semi-major axis (a)	93 AU
Eccentricity (e)	0.5886±0.016
Inclination (i)	104.7±0.4°
Longitude of the node (Ω)	122.4±0.5°
Periastron epoch (T)	2,458,773.2±0.1
Argument of periastron (ω) (secondary)	259±2°

Orbit
Primary	δ Ori Ca
Name	δ Ori Cb
Period (P)	29.96±0.02 days
Semi-major axis (a)	23 R_{☉} (Ca); 60 R_{☉} (Cb)
Eccentricity (e)	0.32±0.07
Inclination (i)	14°
Longitude of the node (Ω)	122.4±0.5°
Periastron epoch (T)	2,453,774.88±0.27
Argument of periastron (ω) (primary)	175±4°
Semi-amplitude (K_{1}) (primary)	10.1±0.8 km/s
Semi-amplitude (K_{2}) (secondary)	26±2 km/s

Details

δ Ori Aa1
Mass	17.8 M_{☉}
Radius	13.1 R_{☉}
Luminosity	190,000 L_{☉}
Surface gravity (log g)	3.55±0.05 cgs
Temperature	31,400±1,000 K
Rotational velocity (v sin i)	114±20 km/s

δ Ori Aa2
Mass	8.518 M_{☉}
Radius	4.168 R_{☉}
Luminosity	16,000 L_{☉}
Surface gravity (log g)	4.13±0.06 cgs
Temperature	25,442±1,500 K
Rotational velocity (v sin i)	89±15 km/s

δ Ori Ab
Mass	8.787 M_{☉}
Radius	12.045 R_{☉}
Luminosity	63,000 L_{☉}
Surface gravity (log g)	3.64±0.05 cgs
Temperature	30,250±1,000 K
Rotational velocity (v sin i)	216±25 km/s

δ Ori Ca
Mass	7 M_{☉}
Radius	5.7 R_{☉}
Luminosity	3,300 L_{☉}
Surface gravity (log g)	4.41 cgs
Temperature	18,400 K

δ Ori Cb
Mass	2.5 M_{☉}
Temperature	10,000 K

Other designations
- Mintaka, δ Orionis, 34 Orionis, 88 G. Orionis, FK5 206, HIP 25930, ADS 4134, CCDM J05320-0018, WDS J05320-0018
- δ Ori A: BD−00°983, GC 6847, HD 36486, HR 1851, SAO 132220/132221
- δ Ori C: BD−00°982, GC 6848, HD 36485, HR 1851, SAO 132221, PLX 1261

Database references
SIMBAD	data
- C

Mintaka /ˈmɪntəkə/, designation Delta Orionis (δ Orionis, abbreviated Delta Ori, δ Ori) and 34 Orionis (34 Ori), is a quintuple star system some 1,200 light-years away in the constellation of Orion. Together with Alnitak (Zeta Orionis) and Alnilam (Epsilon Orionis), the three stars form Orion's Belt, known by many names among ancient cultures. The star is located very close to the celestial equator. When Orion is near the meridian, Mintaka is the rightmost of the Belt's stars when viewed from the Northern Hemisphere facing south.

The five stars form a hierarchy:

- Delta Ori A
  - Delta Ori Aa, an eclipsing binary with an orbital period of 5.7 days
    - Delta Ori Aa1
    - Delta Ori Aa2
  - Delta Ori Ab, which orbits Aa with an orbital period of 152 years
- Delta Ori C, a binary star with an orbital period of 30 days, also known as HD 36485
  - Delta Ori Ca
  - Delta Ori Cb

All five stars are hot and luminous, more massive than the Sun.

== Nomenclature ==
Delta Orionis is the star's Bayer designation, 34 Orionis its Flamsteed designation. The name Mintaka itself is derived from an Arabic term for 'belt': منطقة or manṭaqa. In 2016, the International Astronomical Union organized a Working Group on Star Names (WGSN) to catalog and standardize proper names for stars. The WGSN's first bulletin of July 2016 included a table of the first two batches of names approved by the WGSN, which included Mintaka for this star. It is now so entered in the IAU Catalog of Star Names.

== Observational history ==
Location of δ Orionis (circled), as shown in a conventional star chart with north up

Mintaka is the westernmost of the three stars of Orion's belt. It is easily visible to the naked eye, one of the brightest stars in the sky, and has been known since antiquity.

Radial velocity measurements taken by Henri-Alexandre Deslandres in 1900 at Paris Observatory showed that Mintaka had a variable radial velocity and therefore was a spectroscopic binary. His preliminary orbital period estimate of 1.92 days was shown to be incorrect in 1904 when Johannes Franz Hartmann using photographic plates taken at Potsdam Observatory showed that the orbital period was 5.7 days. Hartmann also noticed that the calcium K line at 393.4 nanometres in the stellar spectrum did not share in the periodic displacements of the lines due to orbital motion of the star and theorized that there was a cloud in the line of sight to Mintaka that contained calcium. This was the first detection of the interstellar medium.

== System ==
Aa1
Period = 5.7 d
Aa2
Period = 152 yr
Ab
52″ separation
Ca
Period = 30 d
Cb

Hierarchy of orbits in the system

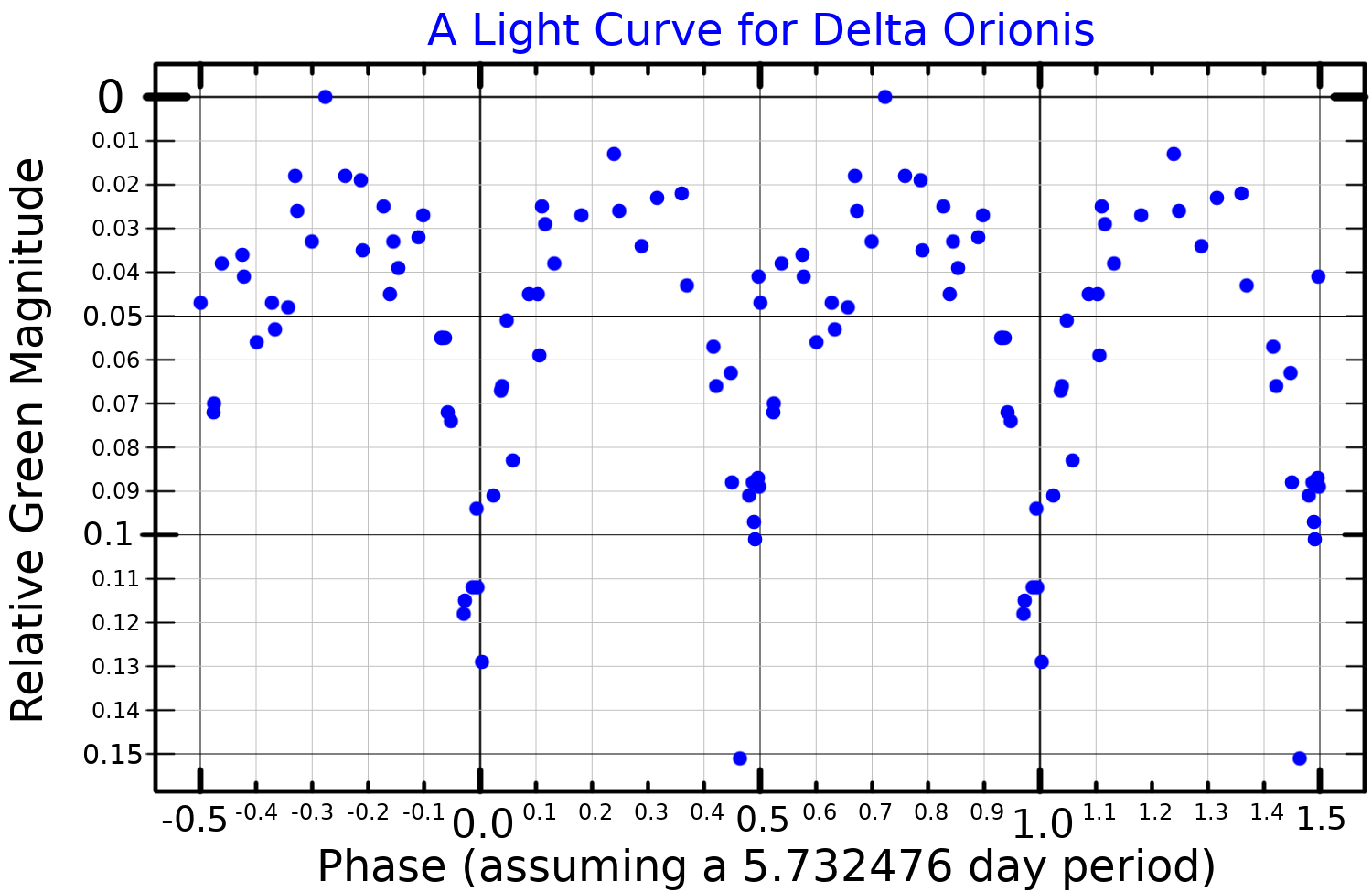
A green band light curve for Delta Orionis, plotted from data published by Koch and Hrivnak (1981)

δ Orionis is a multiple star system. There is a magnitude 7 star about 52 arcseconds away from the second-magnitude primary and a much fainter star in between. The system is designated WDS 05320-0018 in the Washington Double Star Catalog, with the 14th-magnitude companion listed as component B and the seventh-magnitude star as component C.

The primary component is itself a triple system: a class-O9.5 bright giant and a class-B main-sequence star orbit every 5.73 days and exhibit shallow eclipses when the star dims about 0.2 of a magnitude, and a B-class subgiant is resolved 0.26" away. At the primary eclipse, the apparent magnitude (of the whole system) drops from 2.23 to 2.35, while it only drops to 2.29 at the secondary eclipse.

The outer star of the triple system orbits the inner pair once every 53,839 days (147.40 yr). The orbit is quite eccentric, with the separation varying between 8,244 solar radii (38.34 au) and 31,832 solar radii (148.03 au). This star is generally referred to as component Ab, but some catalogues list it as component D, for example CCDM J05320-0018D.

The seventh-magnitude companion, δ Ori C, also known as HD 36485, is a chemically peculiar B-type main-sequence star and itself a spectroscopic binary with a faint A-type companion in a 30-day orbit. It has an unusual spectrum with H-alpha emission and unusually strong helium absorption lines. It has a strong magnetic field and a very slow rotational velocity that produces chemical stratification in its atmosphere, which leads to the unusual abundances seen in the spectrum.

The 14th-magnitude optical companion, δ Orionis B, is thought to be closer than the rest of the system and not physically associated with it. It is likely to be a K-type main sequence star.

Mintaka is surrounded by a cluster of faint stars, possibly part of the cluster surrounding σ Ori.

== Distance ==
The distance derived from the Hipparcos satellite parallax is 212±30 parsecs, while spectroscopic distances, comparisons to similar stars, and cluster membership all suggest a value more than double that. This type of unreconcilable discrepancy is not unique to Mintaka and the reasons for it have yet to be clarified. In Gaia Data Release 3, component C is listed with a parallax of 2.6245±0.0538 mas, consistent with the distances derived by other methods but disagreeing with the Hipparcos-derived value for the primary.

The Gaia DR3 parallax for component B is 3.5002″±0.0119″, strongly suggesting it is considerably closer than the other members of the system and merely a chance alignment. At that distance it is likely to be a K-type main sequence star.

== Etymology and cultural significance ==
Mintaka was seen by astrologers as a portent of good fortune.

=== Orion's Belt ===
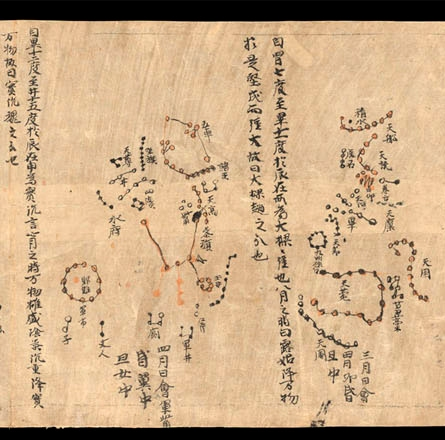
Dunhuang Star Atlas – Orion

The three belt stars were collectively known by many names in many cultures. Arabic terms include Al Nijād 'the Belt', Al Nasak 'the Line', Al Alkāt 'the Golden Grains or Nuts', and, in modern Arabic, Al Mīzān al Ḥakk 'the Accurate Scale Beam'. In Chinese mythology, they were also known as the Weighing Beam.

In Chinese, 參宿 (Shēn Xiù), meaning Three Stars (asterism), refers to an asterism consisting of Mintaka, Alnilam, and Alnitak (Orion's Belt), with Betelgeuse, Bellatrix, Saiph and Rigel later added. Consequently, the Chinese name for Mintaka is 參宿三 (Shēn Xiù Sān, English: the Third Star of Three Stars). It is one of the western mansions of the White Tiger.

== Namesakes ==
The USS Mintaka (AK-94) was a United States Navy Crater-class cargo ship named after the star.
