= Great refractor =

Large telescope with a lens

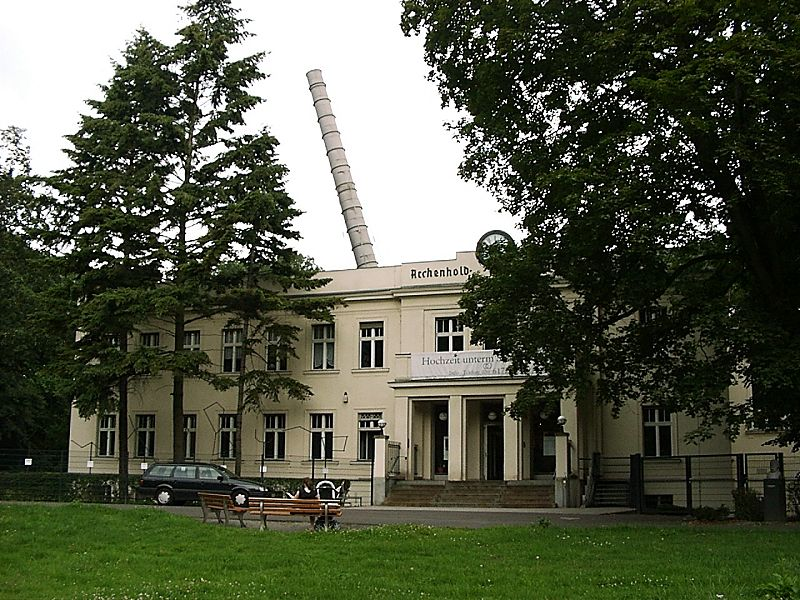
Treptow telescope (aka Himmelskanone) did away with a dome, and the telescope tube extends above the building in this image

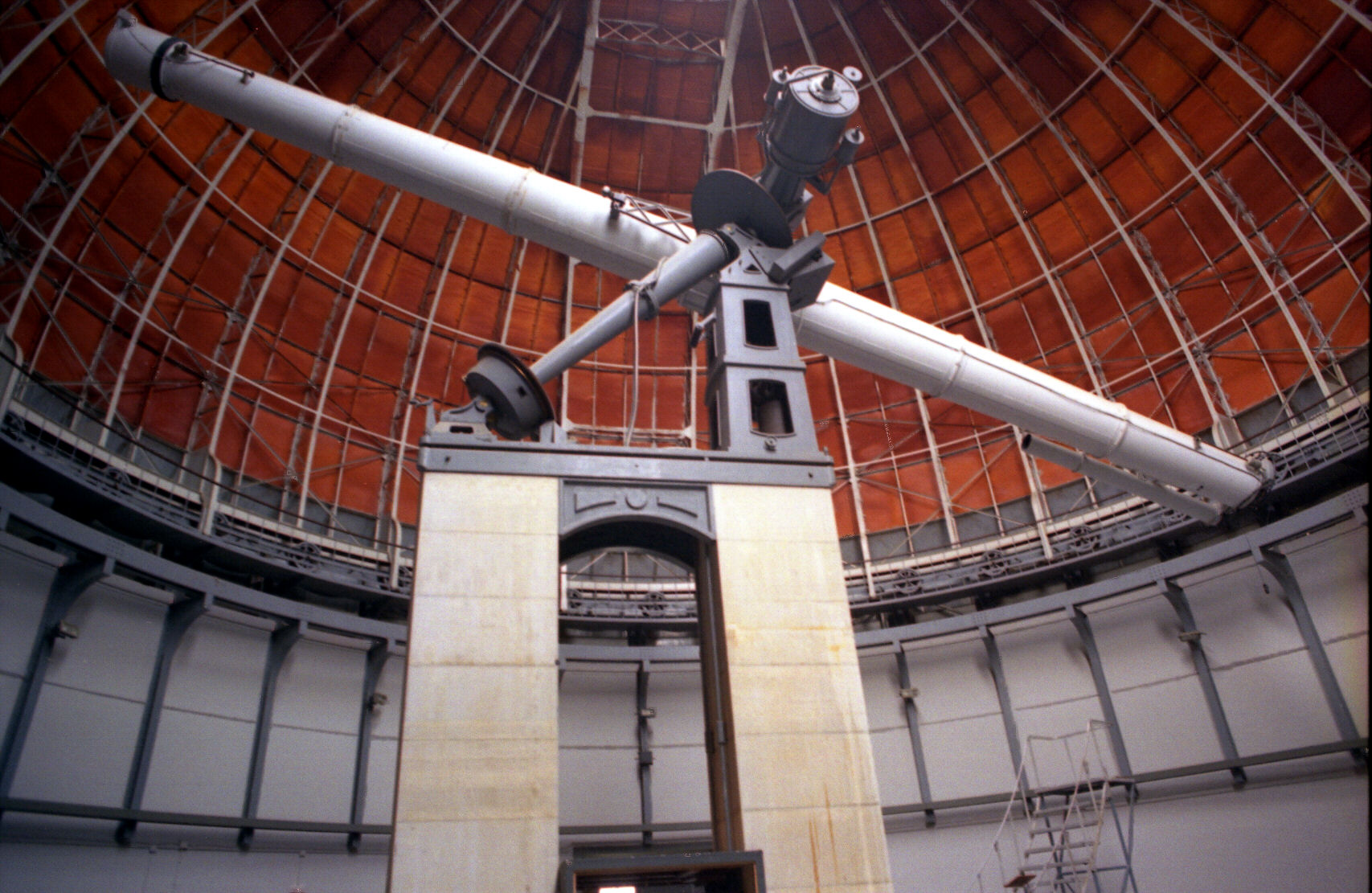
Grande Lunette of Nice Observatory of 1886, with 76 cm aperture

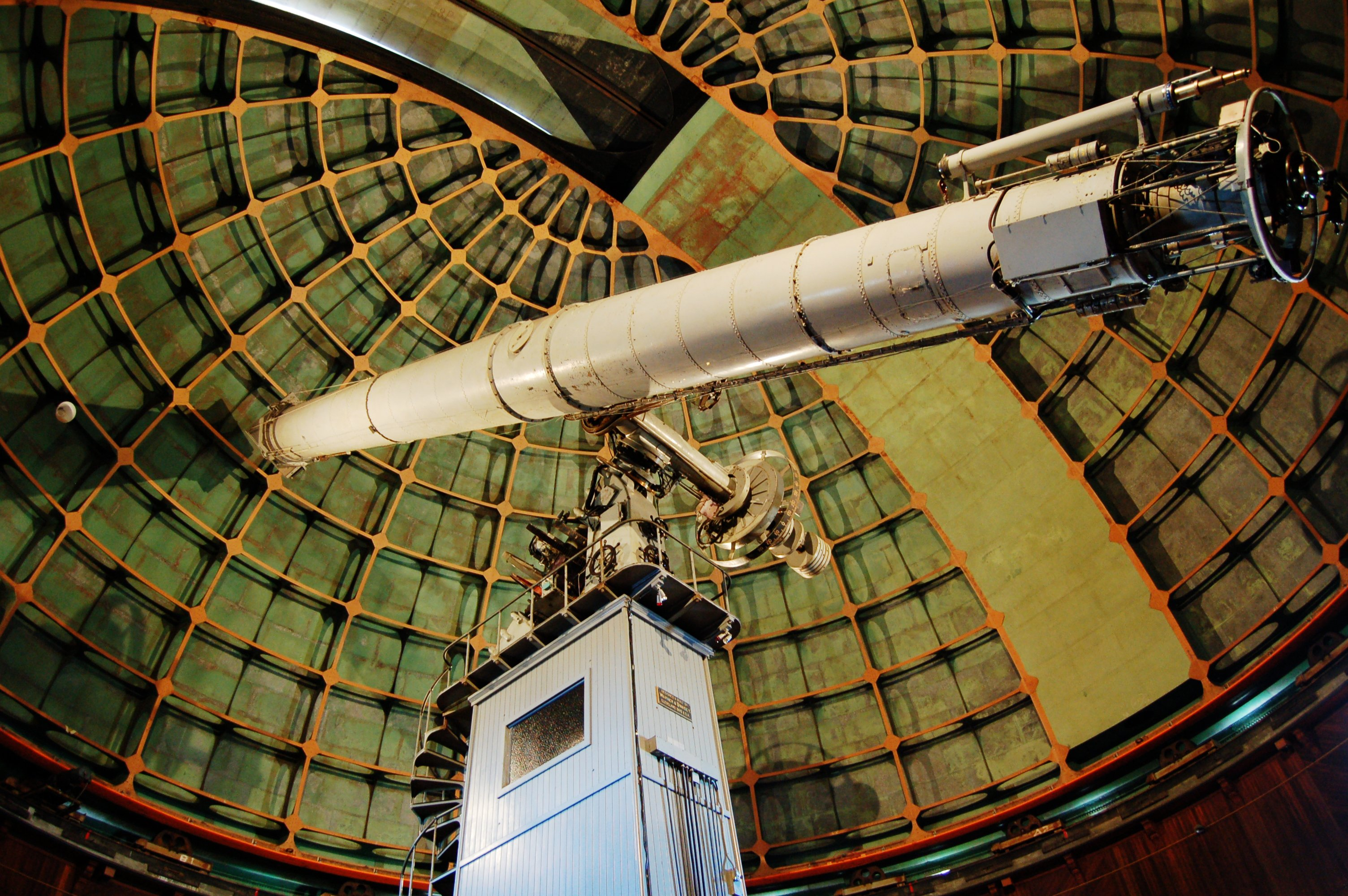
James Lick telescope of 1888, with 91 cm aperture

Great refractor refers to a large telescope with a lens, usually the largest refractor at an observatory with an equatorial mount. The preeminence and success of this style in observational astronomy defines an era in modern telescopy in the 19th and early 20th century. Great refractors were large refracting telescopes using achromatic lenses (as opposed to the mirrors of reflecting telescopes). They were often the largest in the world, or largest in a region. Despite typical designs having smaller apertures than reflectors, great refractors offered a number of advantages and were popular for astronomy. It was also popular to exhibit large refractors at international exhibits, and examples of this include the Trophy Telescope at the 1851 Great Exhibition, and the Yerkes Great Refractor at the 1893 World's Fair in Chicago.

A great refractor was often the centerpiece of a new 19th century observatory, but was typically used with an entourage of other astronomical instruments such as a Meridian Circle, a Heliometer, an Astrograph, and a smaller refractor such as a Comet Seeker or Equatorial. Great refractors were often used for observing double stars and equipped with a Filar micrometer. Pioneering work on astrophotography was done with great refractors.

An example of prime achievements of refractors, over 7 million people have been able to view through the 12-inch Zeiss refractor at Griffith Observatory since it opened in 1935; this is the most people to have viewed through any telescope. In modern times many large refractors have become important historical items, and are often used for public astronomy outreaches. However, many have also been shut down or moved due to their difficulty of use as telescopes. Whereas in the modern era aperture and location are important, the older style observatories were often located near towns because astronomy was only one function; major tasks were simply to record the weather, make accurate determinations of location, and to determine the local time. In modern times many of these functions are performed elsewhere and communicated locally.

Some noted accomplishments of refractors were the discovery of Neptune, the discovery of the Moons of Mars, and the compilation of various star catalogs. A derivative instrument of refractors, the heliometer was used to measure for the first time the distance to another star by geometric parallax in the mid-1800s. As telescopes became larger and longer, the relatively modest increases in aperture belied their enormous size, with moving weights in the multiple tons in domes several stories tall; physically many of the biggest were larger than even some modern reflecting telescopes.

== Beginnings ==
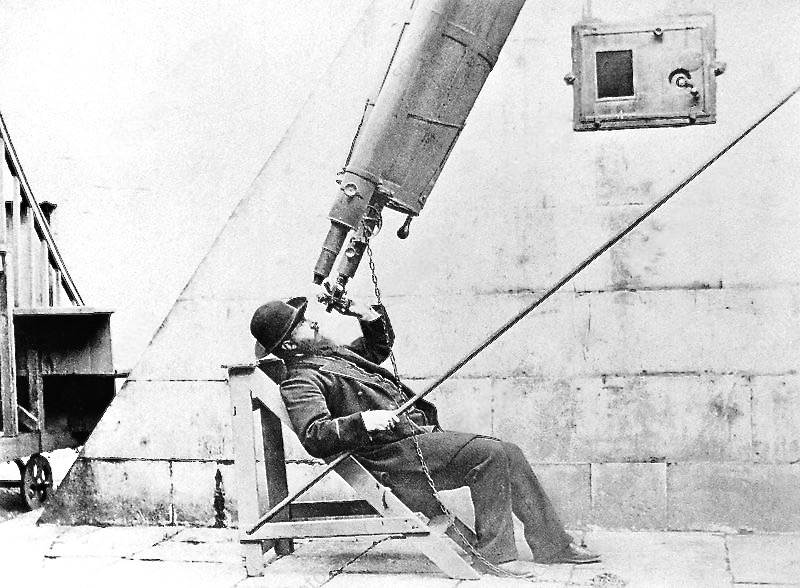
An observer looking through the Markree's Cauchoix great telescope

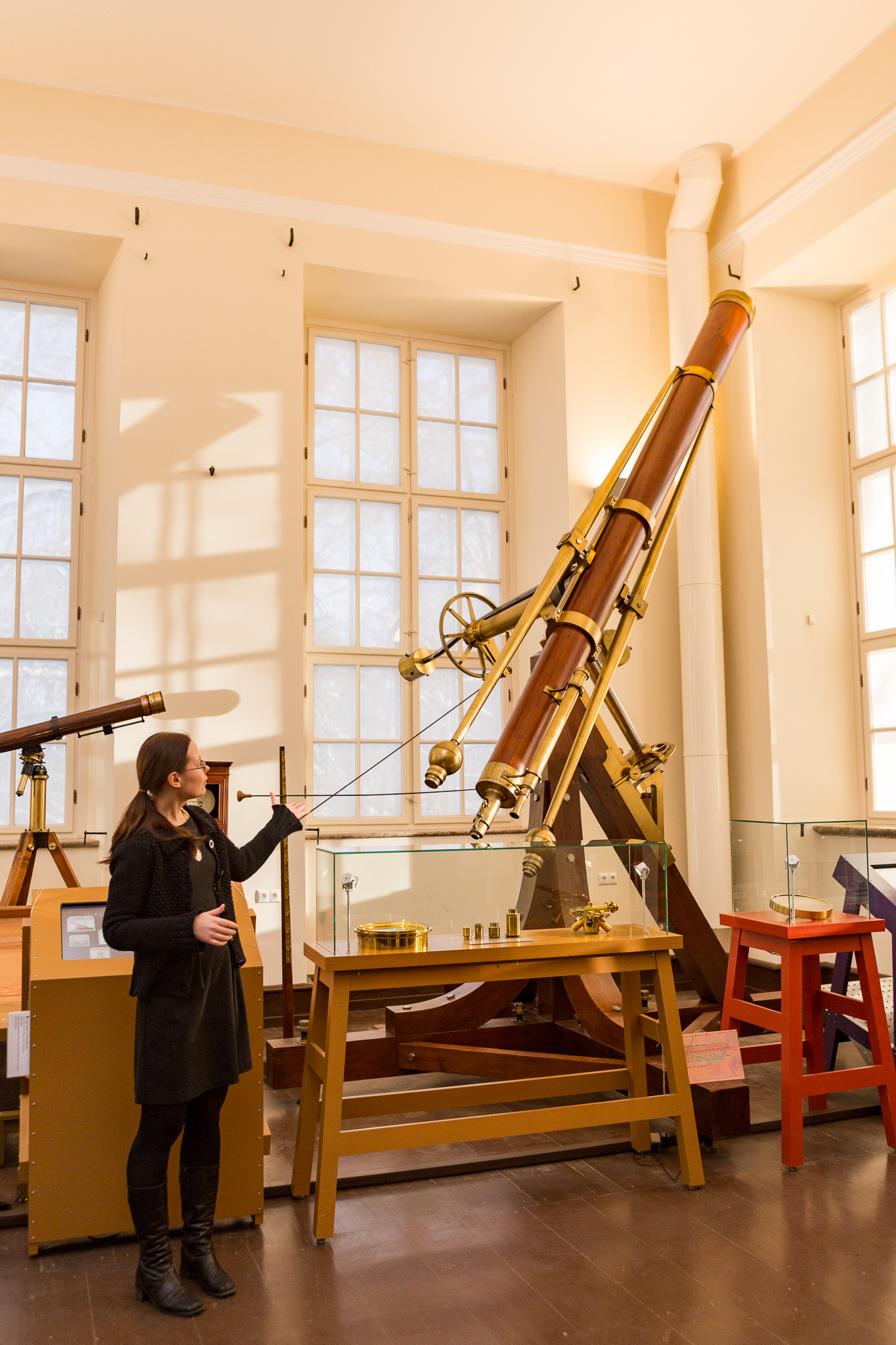
Fraunhofer refractor of 1824, now an exhibit at the old Tartu Observatory museum in Estonia.

In the early 19th century a young Edward Joshua Cooper built in Ireland one of the most richly furnished astronomical observatories of the period. Cooper had acquired the largest lens in the world, made by Cauchoix of Paris, with an objective of 13.3 inches (~34.8 cm) for 1200 pounds, and he placed it as the centerpiece of the observatory. By 1834 it was mounted on an equatorial mounting supplied by Thomas Grubb of Dublin. This was the largest refractor in the world in the early 1830s, and Cooper used the telescope to sketch Halley's comet in 1835 and to view the solar eclipse of 15 May 1836.

In 1833 the Duke of Northumberland donated a Cauchoix of Paris objective lens to establish a large telescope for the new Observatory of Northumberland. The telescope was used for over a century with some updates, but the original was an "achromatic doublet of 11.6 inches clear aperture and focal length 19ft 6in".

== Refractors come of age ==
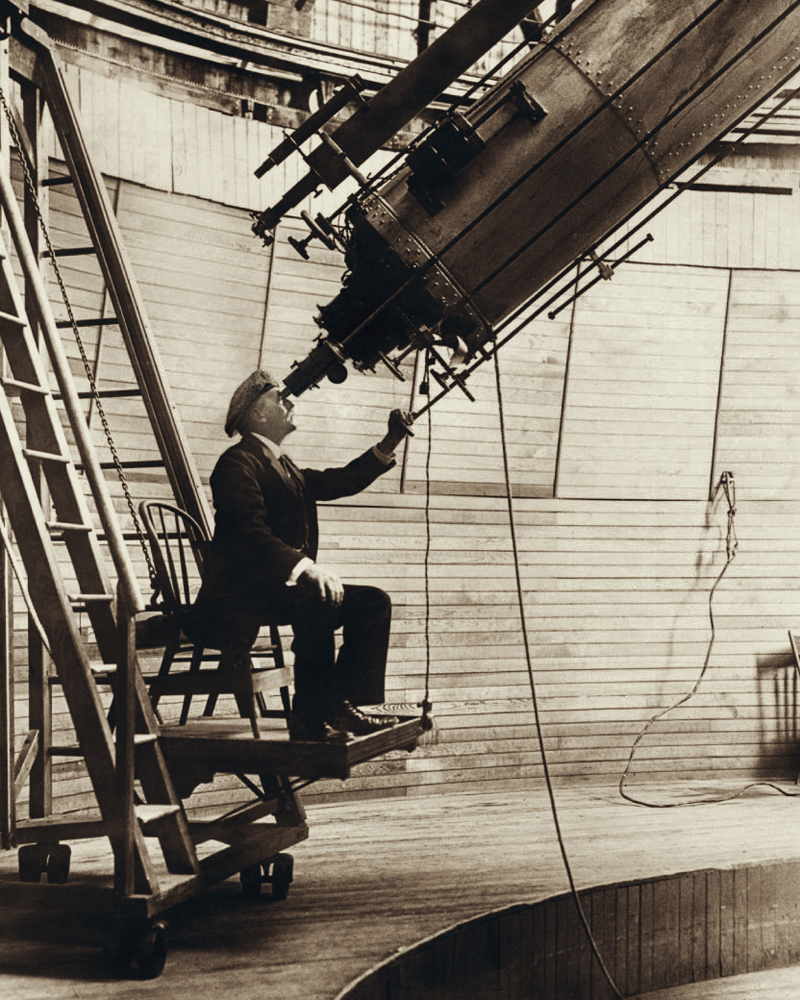
Percival Lowell observing Venus in the daytime from the observer's chair of the 24-inch (61 cm) Alvan Clark refracting telescope in Flagstaff, Arizona.

Although there had been very large (and unwieldy) Non-achromatic aerial telescopes of the late 17th century, and Chester Moore Hall and others had experimented with small achromatic telescopes in the 18th century, John Dollond (1706–1761) invented and created an achromatic object glass and lens which permitted achromatic telescopes up to 3–5 in (8–13 cm) aperture. The Swiss Pierre-Louis Guinand (1748–1824) discovered and developed a way to make much larger crown and flint glass blanks. He worked with instrument maker Joseph von Fraunhofer (1787–1826) to use this technology for instruments in the early 19th century.

The era of great refractors started with the first modern, achromatic, refracting telescopes built by Joseph von Fraunhofer in the early 1820s. The first of these was the Dorpat Great Refractor, also known as the Fraunhofer 9-inch, at what was then Dorpat Observatory in the Governorate of Estonia (Estland) (which later became Tartu Observatory in southern Estonia). This telescope made by Fraunhofer had a 9 Paris inch (about 9.6 in (24 cm)) aperture achromatic lens and a 4 m (13.4 ft) focal length. It was also equipped with the first modern equatorial mount type called a "German equatorial mount" developed by Fraunhofer, a mount that became standard for most large refractors from then on. A Fraunhofer "9-inch" (24 cm) at Berlin Observatory was used by Johann Gottfried Galle in the discovery of Neptune. There is tendency to round apertures to the nearest large figure, which can create a sort of drift when conversions are made; the Fraunhofer "9-inch" were nine paris inches which is about 9.6 in or about 24 cm, not exactly nine English inches, and closer to ten inches. (Paris inches are also called pouces)

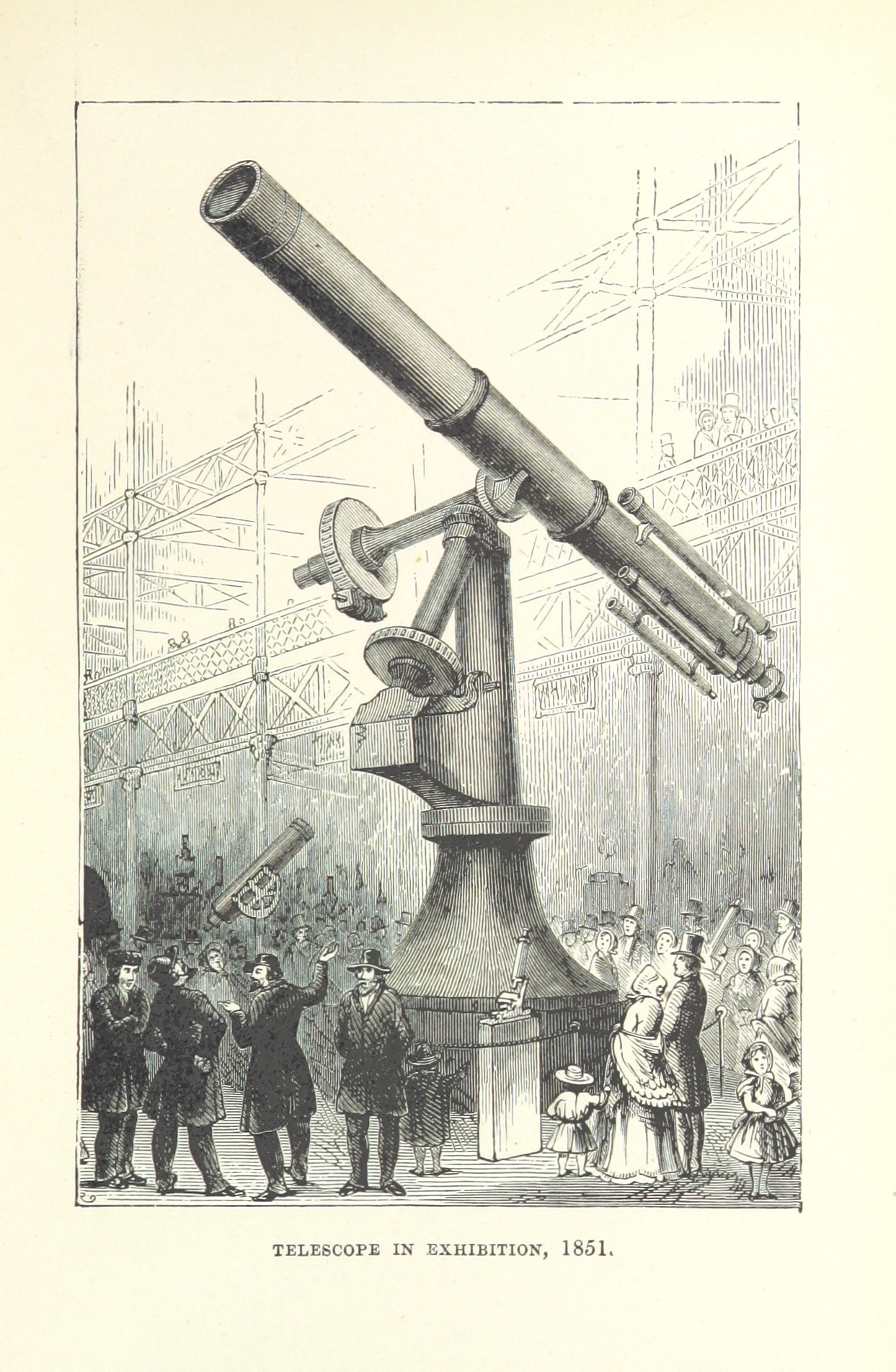
Refractor at an exhibition, 1851

In 1851, at the Great Exhibition in Hyde Park, one of the noted exhibits was telescope with 5 m (16 feet) long tube, called the "Trophy telescope" and was featured in the exhibition. The telescope was placed by the astronomer James William Grant, and it had an 11-inch aperture (280mm) and a 16 feet (4.88m) focal length.

At the 1861 International Exhibit, the size increased to showing a telescope with 21-inch objective lens. The Buckingham or Walworth Common telescope's objective was manufactured by William Wray.

On January 31, 1862, American telescope-maker and astronomer Alvan Graham Clark first observed the faint companion, which is now called Sirius B, or affectionately "the Pup". This happened during testing of an 18.5-inch (470 mm) aperture great refractor telescope for Dearborn Observatory, which was one of the largest refracting telescope lens in existence at the time, and the largest telescope in the United States.

A 25-inch (63.5 cm) objective refractor was installed in the Newall telescope. This had an objective made by the makers Chance, with the overall telescope made by Thomas Cooke. The telescope was made for Robert Stirling Newall, and when completed in 1869 was the largest refracting telescope in the world. In the 1950s the University of Cambridge donated the Newall telescope to the National Observatory of Athens, who accepted the gift and it has been there ever since. In Greece, it was installed in new custom dome building near the Pendeli mountain.

== The Golden era ==
Refracting telescopes would quadruple in size by the end of the century, culminating with the largest practical refractor ever built, the Yerkes Observatory 40-inch (1 meter) aperture of 1895. This great refractor pushed the limits of technology of the day; the fabrication of the two element achromatic lens (the largest lens ever made at the time), required 18 attempts and cooperation between Alvan Clark & Sons and Charles Feil of Paris. To achieve its optical aperture it was actually slightly bigger physically, at 41 3/8 in. Refractors had reached their technological limit; the problems of lens sagging from gravity meant refractors would not exceed around 1 meter, although Alvan G. Clark, who had made the Yerkes 40-inch objective, said a 45-inch (114 cm) would be possible before he died. In addition to the lens, the rest of the telescope needed to be a practical and highly precise instrument, despite the size. For example, the Yerkes tube alone weighed 75 tons, and had to track stars just as accurately as a smaller instrument.

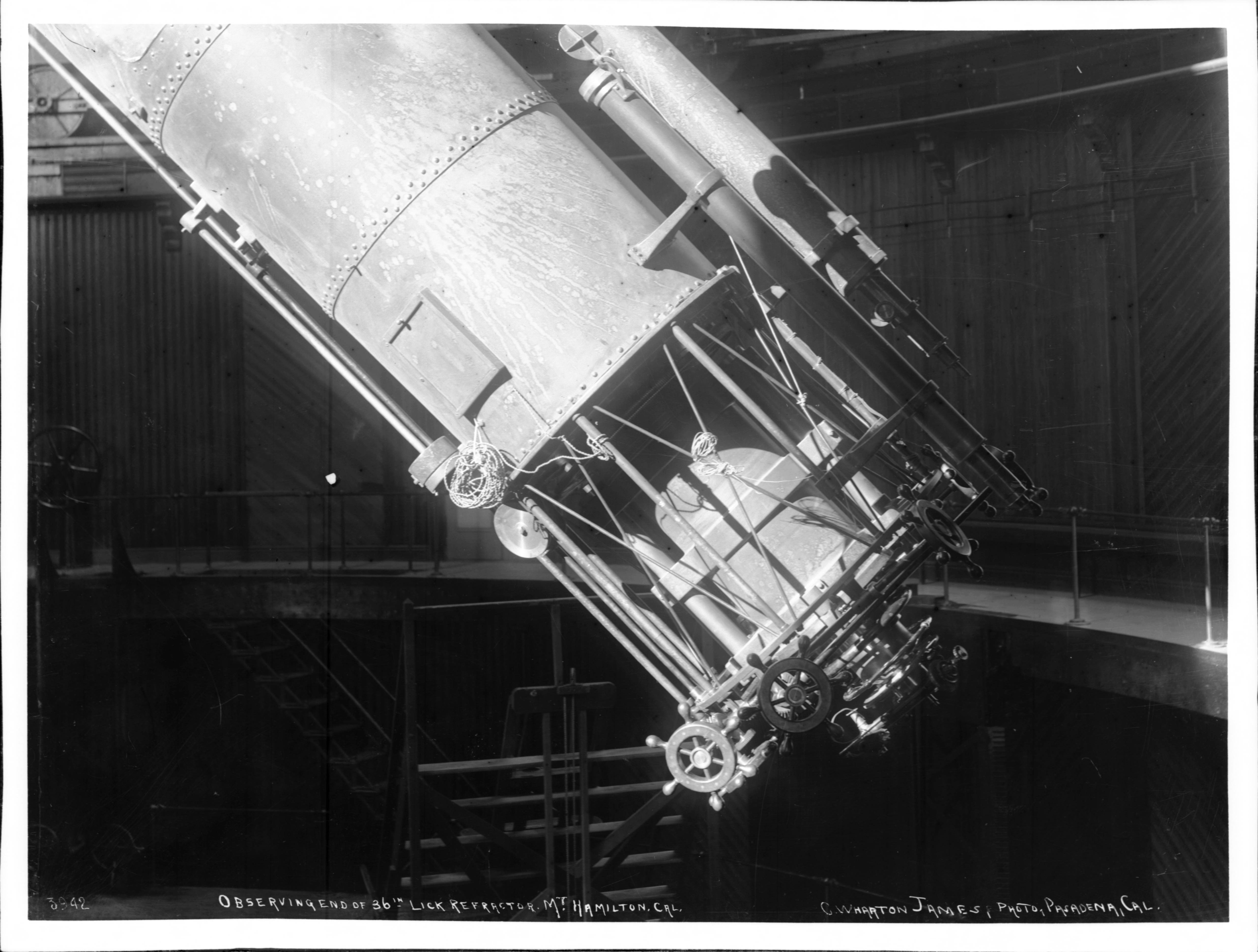
Observer end of the Lick telescope

The choice between large refractors or reflectors was driven by the technology of the time. For refractors, the difficulties of fabricating two disks of optical glass for a large achromatic lens were formidable. For reflectors in much of the 19th century, the preferred material of a primary mirror was speculum metal, a substance that reflected up to 66 percent of the light that hit it and tarnished in months. They had to be removed, polished, and re-figured to the correct shape. This sometimes proved so difficult, that a telescope mirror was abandoned. In the mid-19th century a technique for coating glass with metal offered a major advantage and this technology became more common in the following decades. In the 21st century metal-coated glass mirrors remain popular, including on space telescopes like the Hubble Space Telescope.

The Great Paris Exhibition Telescope of 1900 was fixed in a horizontal position to overcome gravitational distortion on its 1.25 m (49.2 in) lens and was aimed with a 2 m siderostat. This demonstration telescope was scrapped after the Exposition Universelle closed. The Treptow refractor was built for Great Industrial Exposition of Berlin of 1896.

In the late 19th century, the big refractors reached some of their great successes including the discovery of the moons of Mars in 1877 and the Jovian moon Amalthea in 1892. That was the first new moon of Jupiter to be found since Galileo. In addition, they were used for groundbreaking work on astrophotography and spectroscopy. The discovery of interstellar calcium in 1904, by the Potsdam great refractor, rounded out their discoveries. However, through this time they were overshadowed by large reflectors such as the Leviathan of Parsonstown, and work with the Crossley Reflector and increasingly larger silver-and-glass mirrors marked large refractors' obsolescence.

== End of the era ==
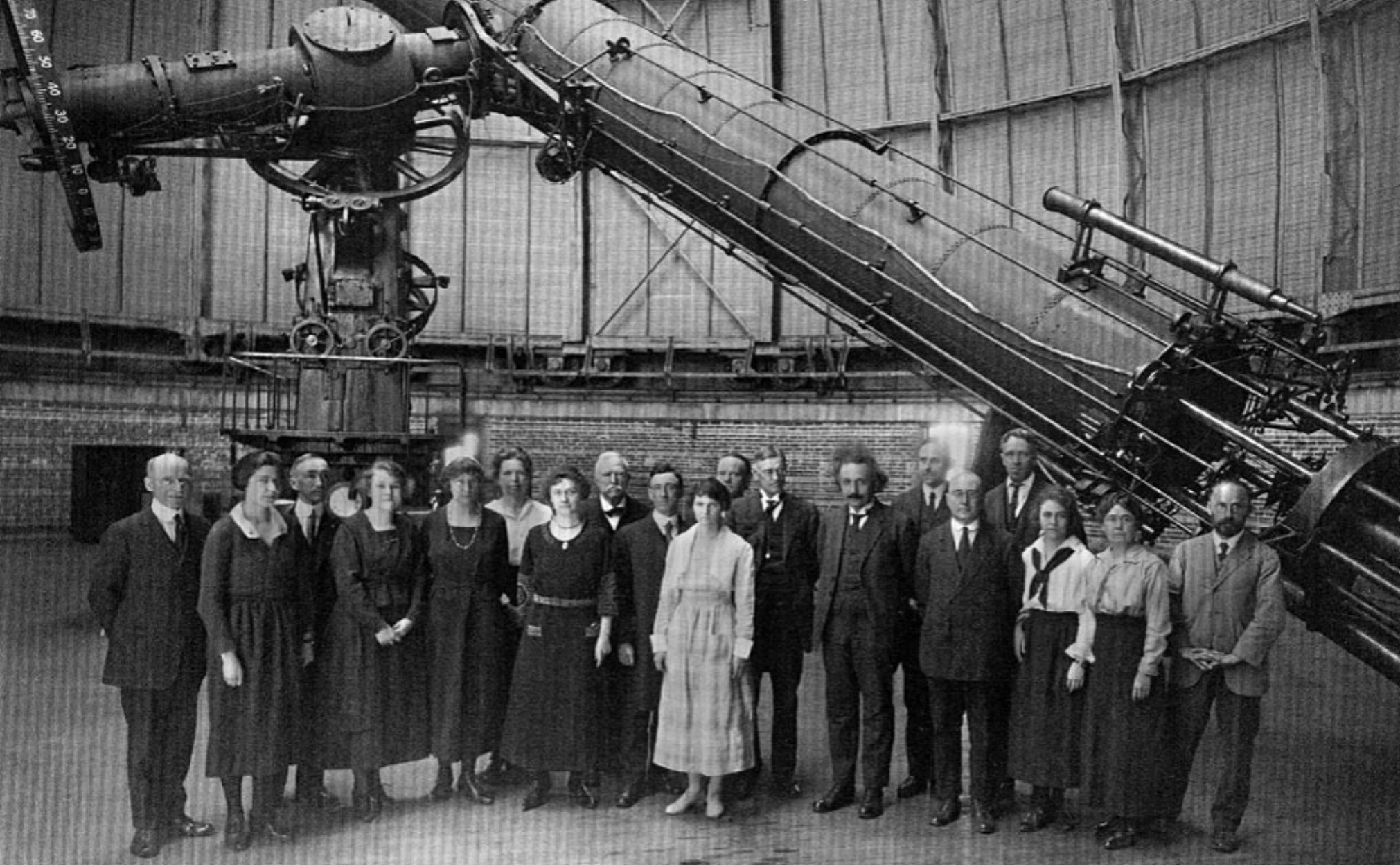
The 40-inch (1.02 m) Refractor, at Yerkes Observatory, the largest by famed lens makers Alvin & Clark

The era slowly came to end as large reflecting telescopes superseded the great refractors. In 1856–57, Carl August von Steinheil and Léon Foucault introduced a process of depositing a layer of silver on glass telescope mirrors. Silvered glass mirrors were a vast improvement over speculum metal and made reflectors a practical instrument. The era of large reflectors had begun, with telescopes such as the 36-inch (91 cm) Crossley Reflector (1895), 60-inch (1.5 m) Mount Wilson Observatory Hale telescope of 1908, and the 100-inch (2.5 m) Mount Wilson Hooker telescope in 1917. Two other big telescopes that surpassed the largest refractors in aperture were the Dominion Astrophysical Observatory and the David Dunlap Observatory in Canada, which came online in the early 1900s.

The largest refractor in Europe, with the exhibition scope dismantled, would be the double telescope, with 33-inch (84 cm) primary, La Grande Lunette at Meudon (later part of Paris Observatory). This was manufactured by the Henry Brothers and Gautier, who had also made the big Expo telescope of 1900.

== Photographic vs. Visual ==
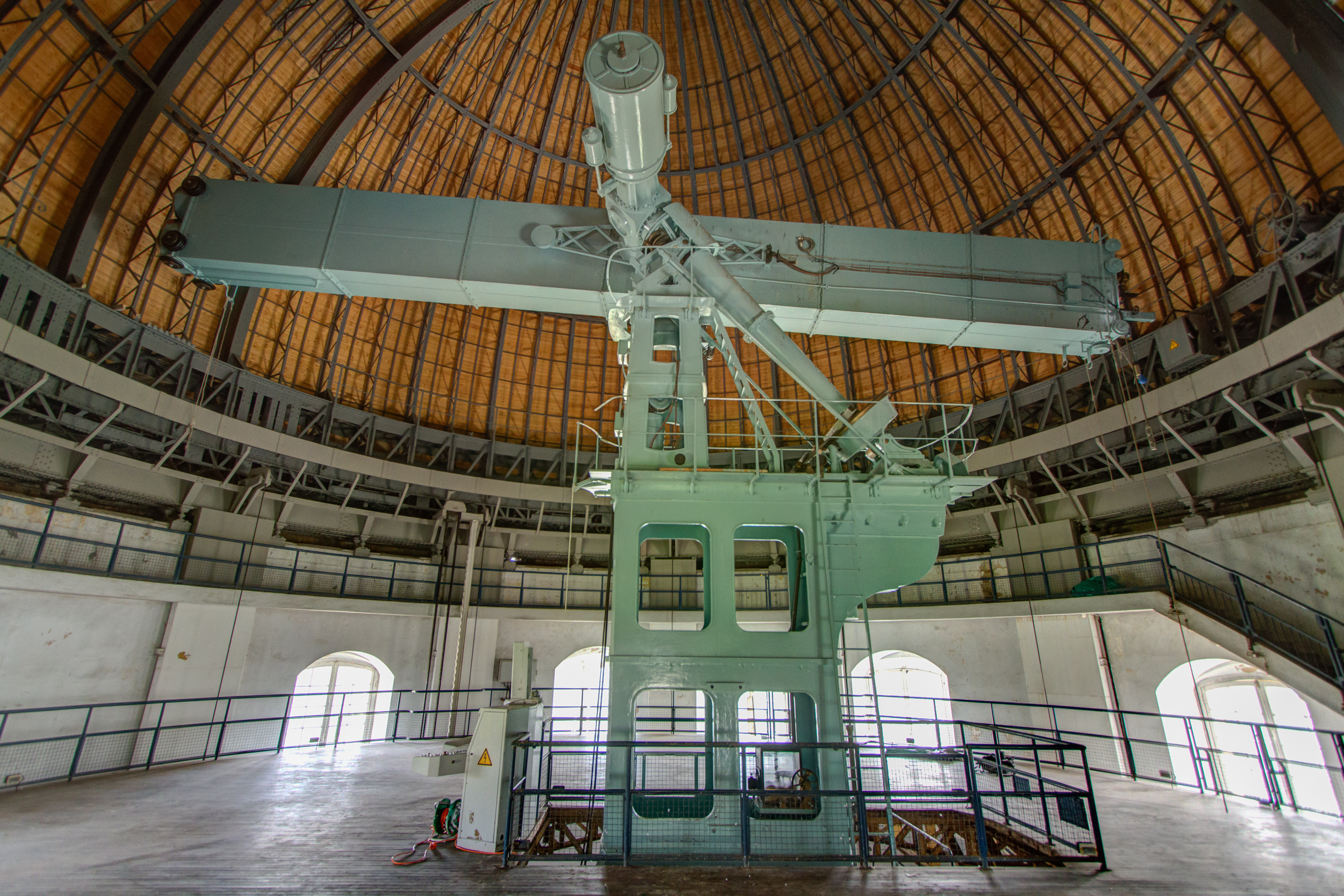
The Grande Lunette of Meudon Observatory (France), is a double refractor with both a 83 cm and 62 cm on one shaft and came online in 1891.

The advent of chemical-based astrophotography in the late 19th century brought difficulties in adapting great refractors to this application. Achromatic lenses were color corrected for what the human eye was sensitive to, yellow light, while photography plates at that time were more sensitive to light at the blue end of the spectrum, requiring a lens with a different color correction and focal plane. Solutions to this problem included:

- mounting two telescopes side by side, one with a visual objective and one with a photographic objective
- mounting a single telescope but having an interchangeable visual objective and photographic objective
- creating objective lenses for visual use which had an additional correcting lens that could be added for photographic work
- make special objective lenses that could be reversed, one way it was a visual objective, flipped over it was a photographic objective

An example of the first case was the Meudon Great Refractor in Paris, which was finished in 1891. This had a visual objective lens of 32.7 inches on one tube, and alongside it another tube with a lens of 24.4 inches intended for photographic work. An example of converting to photographic work with a third corrector lens is the Lick telescope. A 33-inch corrector lens was used to convert this telescope for photography.

== Examples ==
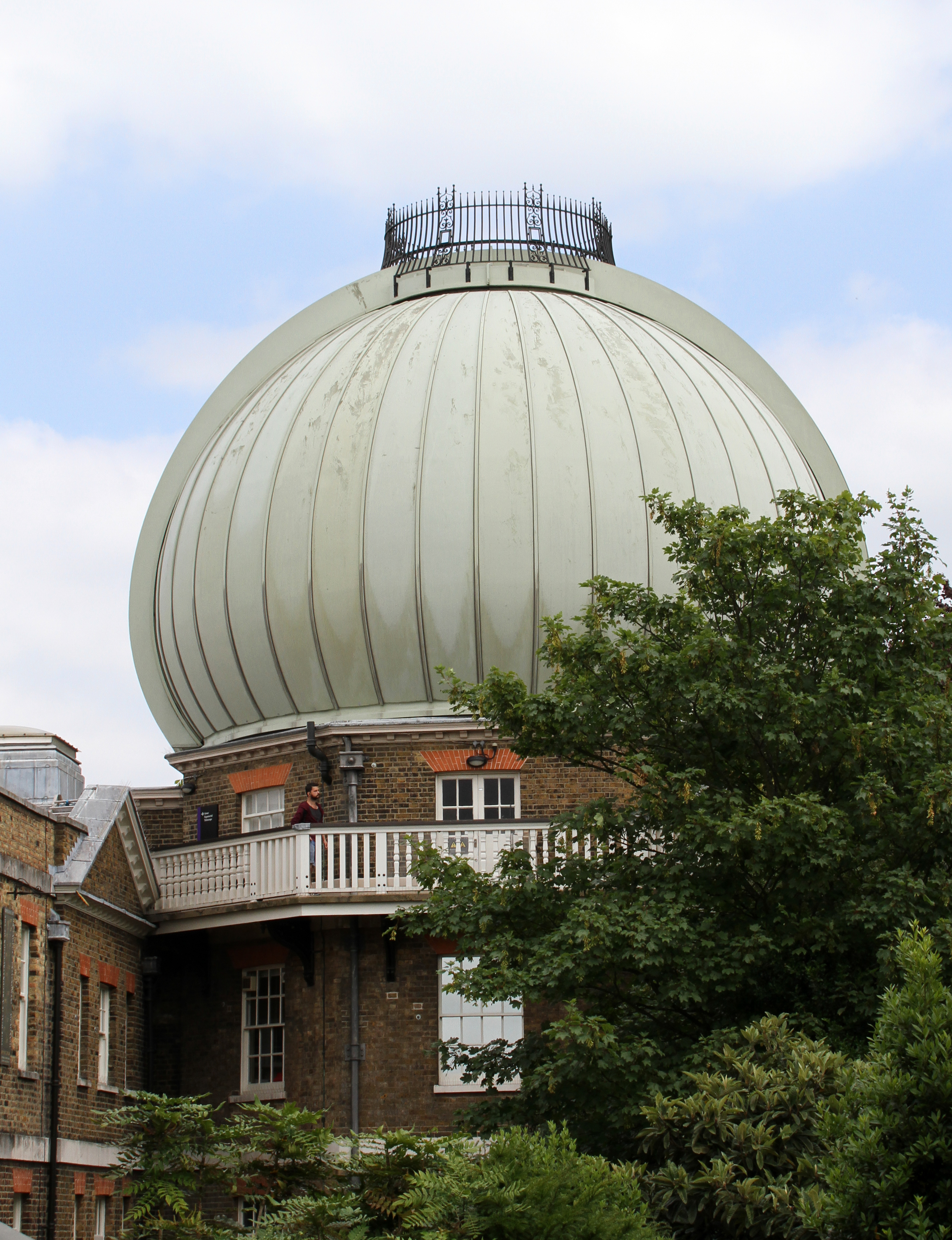
Dome of Greenwich 28 inch Great refractor

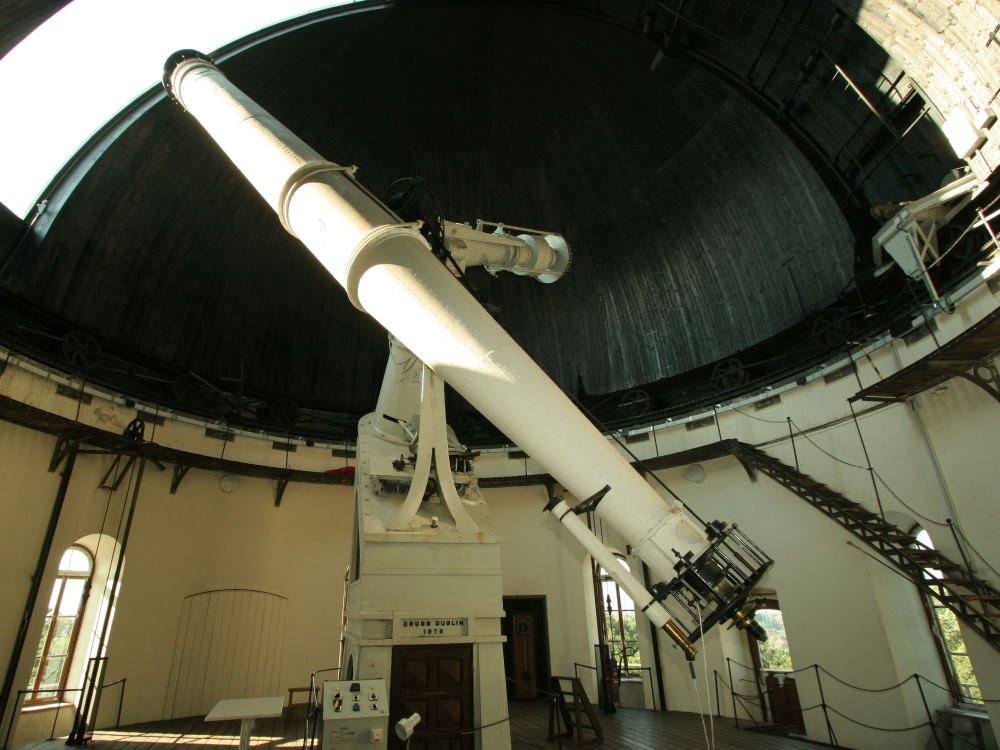
Vienna Observatory's Großer Refraktor ("Great Refractor") of 1880, with 69 cm aperture

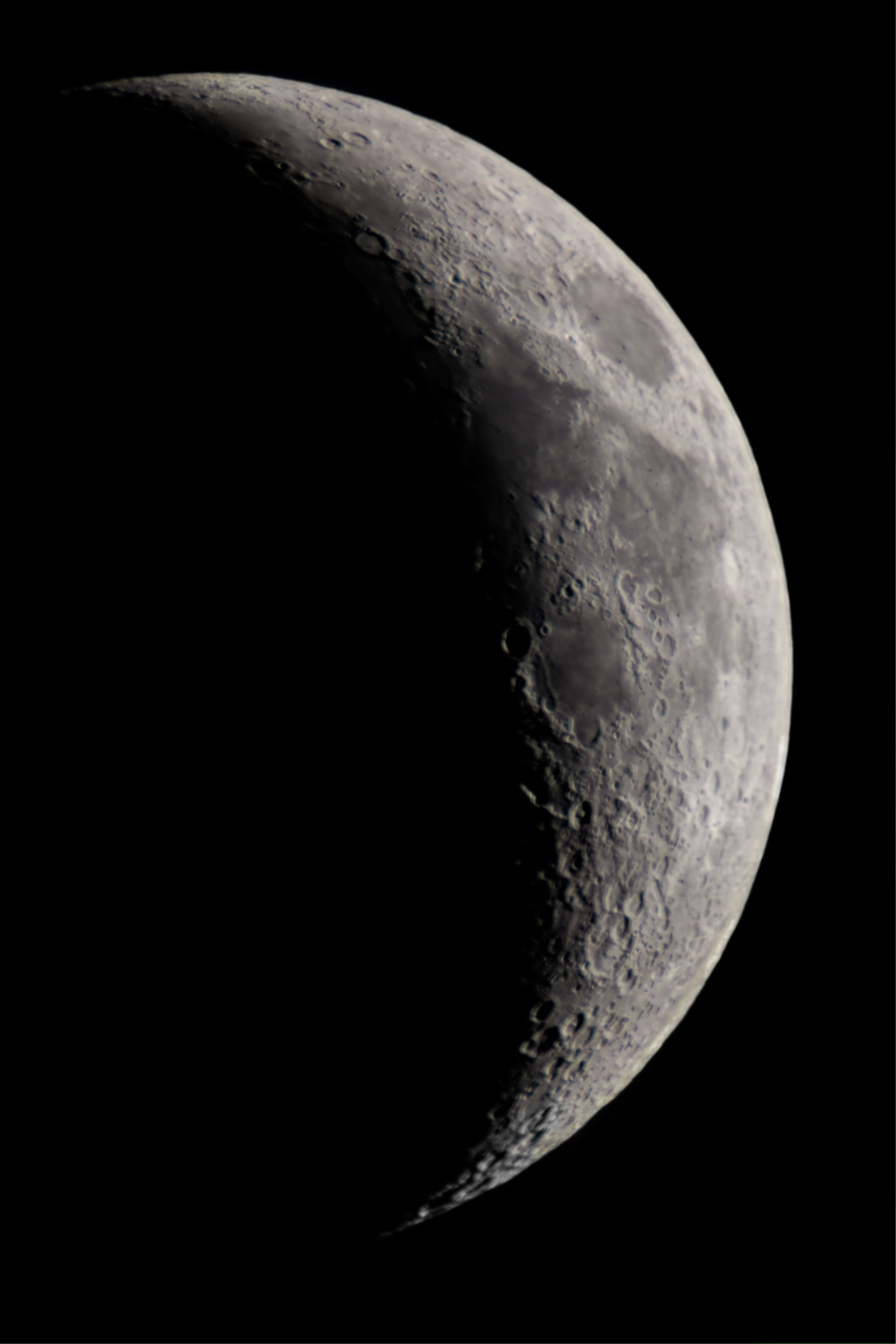
Modern astrophotograph of the moon with a refractor (27 cm ~10.6 inch) aperture at Kuffner Observatory of Vienna, Austria.

Great refractors were admired for their quality, durability, and usefulness which correlated to features such as lens quality, mount quality, aperture, and also length. Length was important because unlike reflectors (which can be folded and shortened), the focal length of glass lens correlated to the physical length of the telescope and offered some optical and image quality advantages.

=== Aperture ===
The progression of largest refracting telescopes in the 19th century, including some telescopes at private observatories that were not really used very much or had problems.

Selected Largest 19th Century Great Refractors by Year
Observatory	Aperture	Year(s)	Lens Maker	Note
Capodimonte Observatory	17,5 cm	1814	Fraunhofer	see the record
Dorpat Observatory	24 cm	1826	Fraunhofer	
Kensington Observatory	30 cm	1829–1838	Cauchoix	Defunct 1836 or 1838
Markree Observatory	34 cm	1834	Cauchoix	
Pulkovo observatory	38 cm	1839	Merz and Mahler	
–	61 cm	1852–1857	Chance Brothers	Craig telescope
Dearborn Observatory	47 cm	1862	Alvan Clark & Sons	Smaller than Craig
–	53 cm	1862		Buckingham London Exhibition telescope
Newall Observatory	64 cm	1871	Chance Brothers	Hardly used until 1891
U.S. Naval Observatory	66 cm	1873	Alvan Clark & Sons	
Vienna Observatory	69 cm	1880	Grubb	
Pulkovo observatory	76 cm	1885	Alvan Clark & Sons	
Nice Observatory	77 cm	1886	Gautier & Henry	Grande Lunette
Lick Observatory	91 cm	1888	Alvan Clark & Sons	
Yerkes Observatory	102 cm	1897	Alvan Clark & Sons	
–	125 cm	1900	Gautier & Mantois	Paris Exhibition telescope; Used 1 Year Only

Some of the second-largest refractors, or otherwise notable.

Other & Double Telescope Great Refractors
Observatory	Name	Aperture(s)	Year	Lens Maker
Berlin Observatory		24 cm	1835	Merz and Mahler
Harvard College Observatory	Harvard Great Refractor	38 cm	1847	Merz and Mahler
Cambridge Observatory	Northumberland Equatorial	30 cm	1835	Cauchoix
Royal Greenwich Observatory	28-inch Grubb Refractor	71 cm	1893	Chance Brothers
Astrophysical Observatory Potsdam	Potsdam Große Refraktor	80 cm + 50 cm	1899	
Paris Observatory	Meudon 33-inch	83 cm + 62 cm	1891	Henry Brothers & Gautier

=== Focal length ===
Approximate historical progression of some of the Great refactors of the late 19th century:

Selected Longest 19th Century Great Refractors after 1873
Observatory	Length	Aperture	Year(s)	Note
U.S. Naval Observatory	9.9 m	66 cm (26")	1873	
Vienna Observatory	10.5 m	69 cm (27")	1880	
Nice Observatory	17.9 m	77 cm (30.3")	1886	Biscoffscheim
Treptow Observatory	21 m	68 cm (26.77")	1896	No dome
Yerkes	19 m	102 cm (40")	1897	Alvan Clark & Sons's Biggest Lens
(Exhibition scope only)	57 m	125 cm (49.2")	1900	Great Paris Exhibition Telescope of 1900

As long as these were, they were actually much shorter than the longest singlet refractors in aerial telescopes.

The Paris exhibition scope, besides from using a mirror to aim, was not really an observatories 'great' refractor in that sense, but its possible it might have been and both the enormous Yerkes and Treptow refractors actually debuted at exhibitions, which were major events of the period.

== Gallery ==
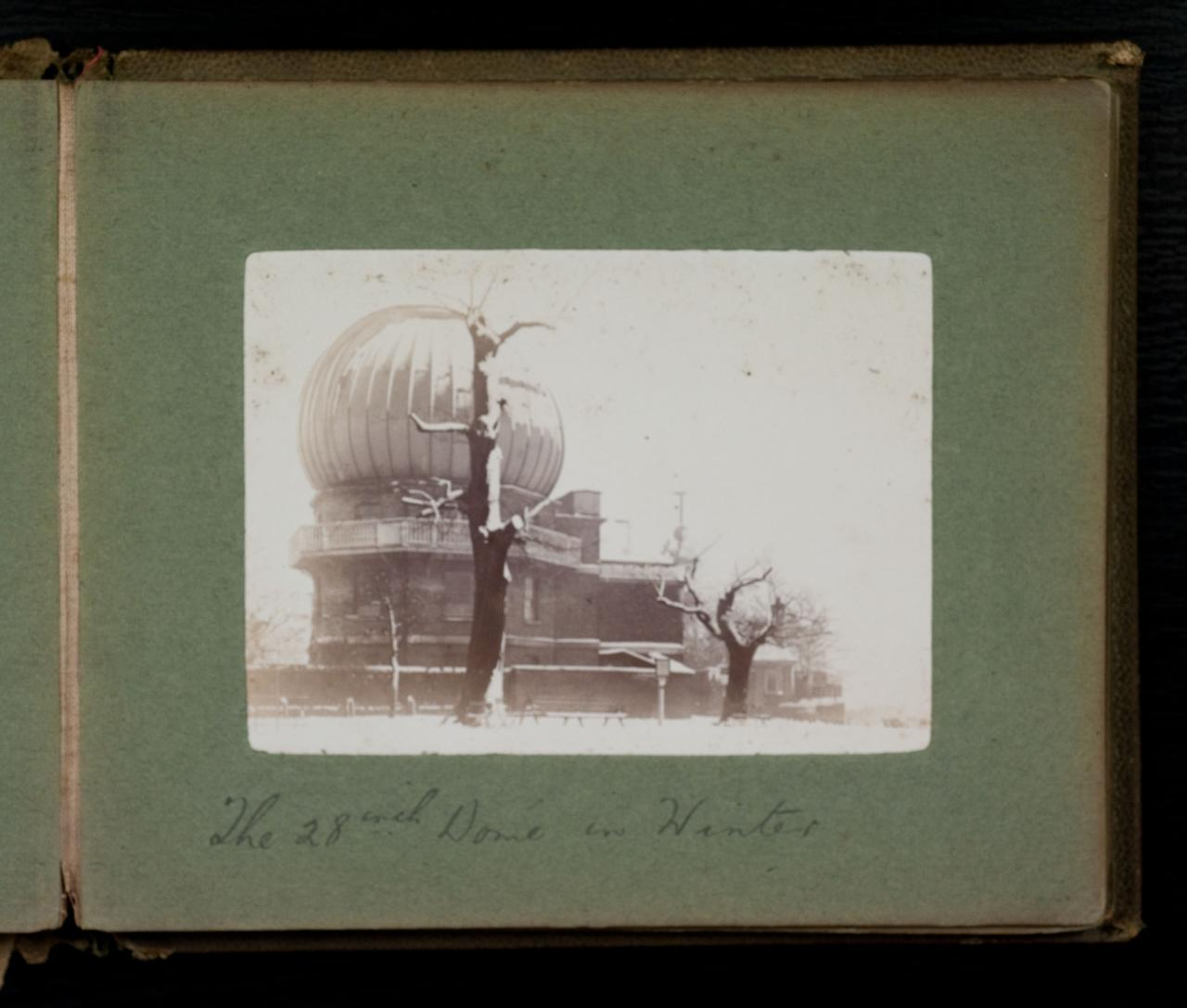
Dome of the Royal Observatory Greenwich 28-inch refractor, circa 1900

Modern day video of Großer Refraktor of 1896 at Treptow Observatory, later renamed Archenhold Observatory

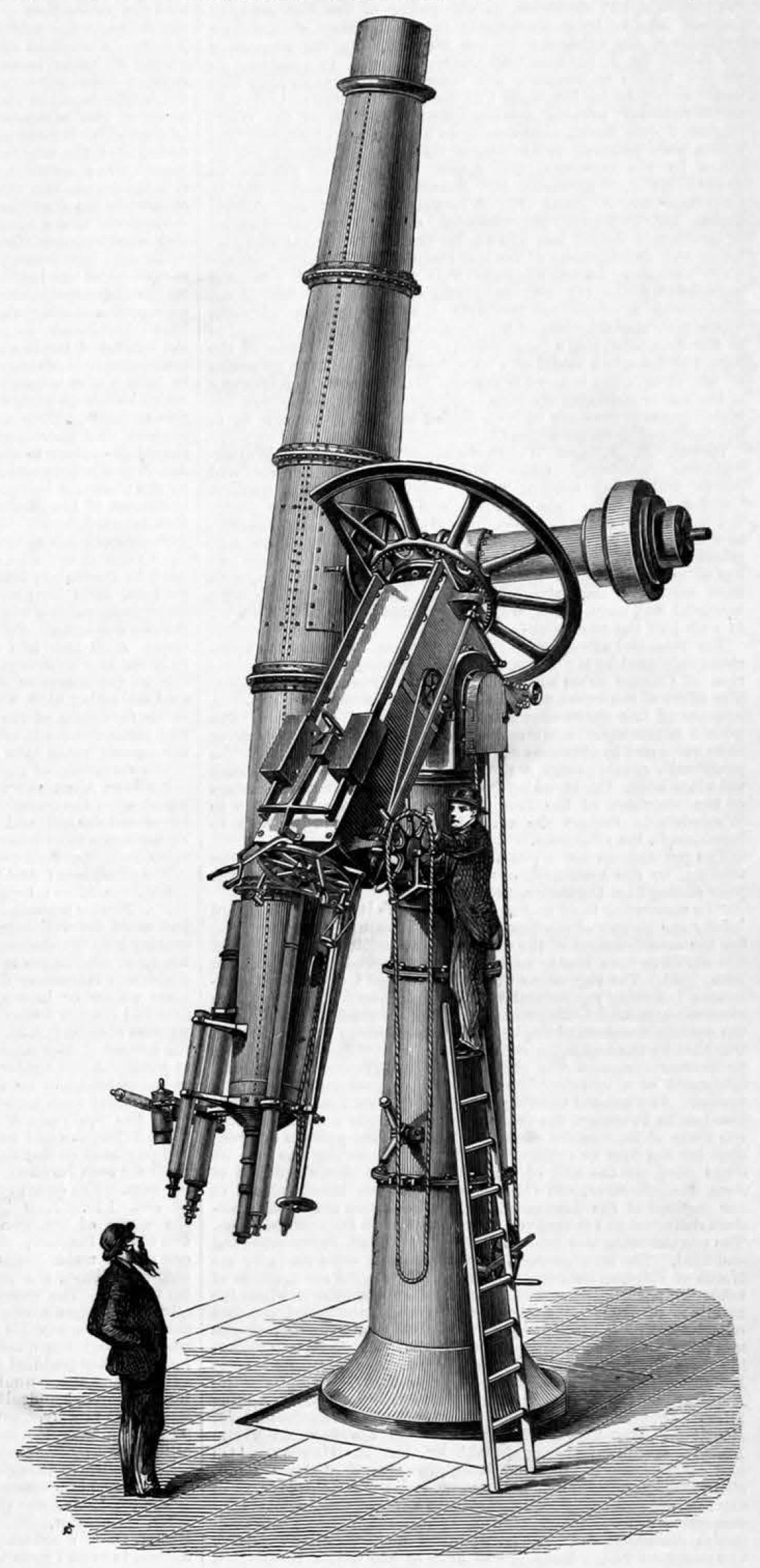
Newall refractor (1870 diagram)

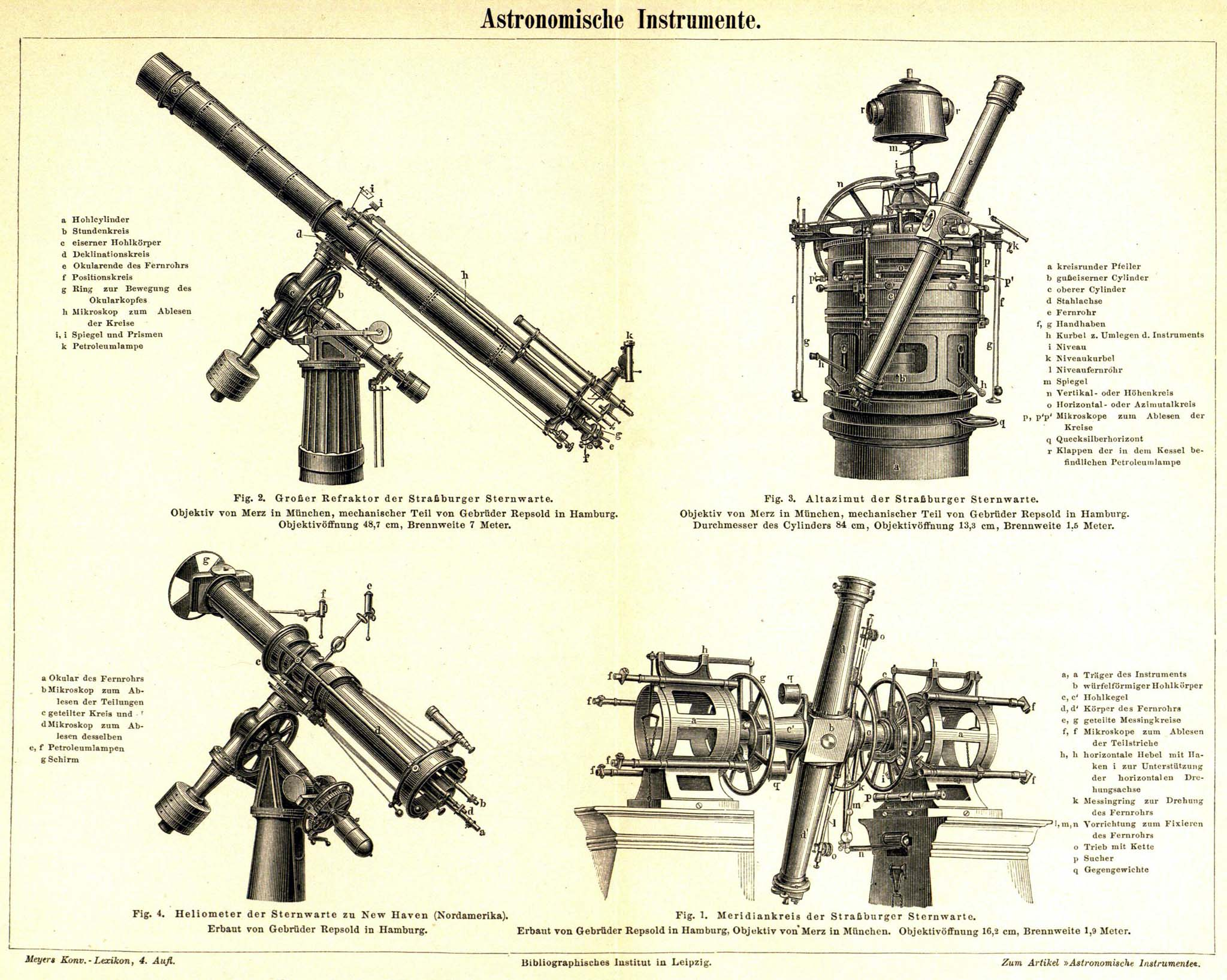
Four astronomical instruments of the Strasbourg Observatory, including its Großer Refraktor

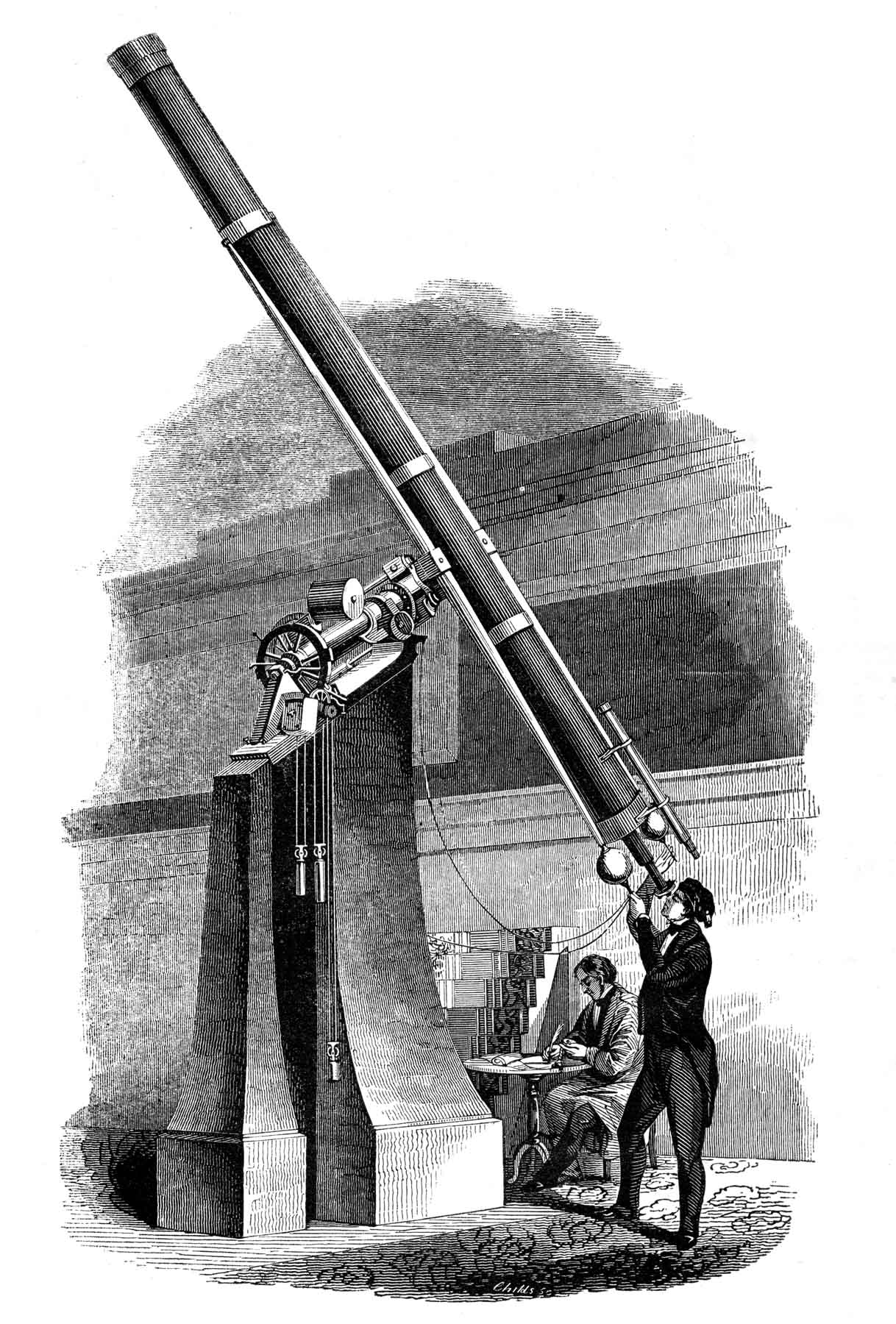
Cincinnati Observatory, Illustration of the 11 inch "Merz and Mahler" refracting telescope (from "Smith's Illustrated Astronomy" 1848).

== Observations ==
The Moon through a 10-inch aperture Grubb refractor

== See also ==
- Achromatic lens
- Aerial telescope
- Apochromat
- Extremely large telescope
- List of largest optical refracting telescopes
- List of largest optical telescopes in the 18th century
- List of largest optical telescopes in the 19th century
- List of largest optical telescopes in the 20th century
- List of telescope types
