= Paul Ferdinand Gautier =

French scientific instrument maker

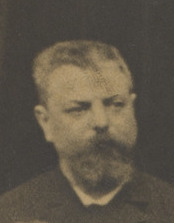
Paul Ferdinand Gautier 1887 in Paris

Paul Ferdinand Gautier (12 October 1842 – 7 December 1909) was a French scientific instrument maker who specialized in precision astronomical telescopes and measuring equipment. He produced instruments for many participants of the 1887 Carte du Ciel project.

== Biography ==
Gautier came from a modest Parisian family and was forced to leave school and work as an apprentice at the age of thirteen. He trained in geometry and at eighteen he joined Secretan where he worked under William Eichens (1818-1884). They were involved in setting up the reflecting telescope at for Leon Foucalt (1819-1868) at Marseille in 1863. When Eichens founded his own company in 1866, Gautier joined and after about ten years he founded his own workshop. He exhibited a dividing engine at the 1878 Paris Universal Exhibition. In 1881 Gautier bought up Eichens' firm. He began to develop several equatorial coude telescopes based on the design of Maurice Loewy which were used widely. He used lenses made by the brothers Paul and Prosper Henry. Gautier also made innovations to the micrometer to reduce errors in measurement. He worked on a large refractor with a 132 cm diameter lens for the 1900 Paris exhibition financed by the French politician François Deloncle and his private society, however this was a disaster as the telescope was not placed in an appropriate location and failure of payments for it nearly destroyed his company. At the height of his success in 1900 he employed 40 people at his Arago boulevard workshop and had built 17 equatorial telescopes, 7 coudes, 3 refractors, 7 meridian circles, 5 siderostats, 3 azimuth telescopes, 13 astrographs and numerous smaller instruments. Gautier continued to work and developed a printing chronograph. His company was purchased after his death by G. Prin in 1910 and came to be called Ets, Secretan, Epry, Jecquelin successeurs. Gautier was made knight of the legion of honour in 1889.

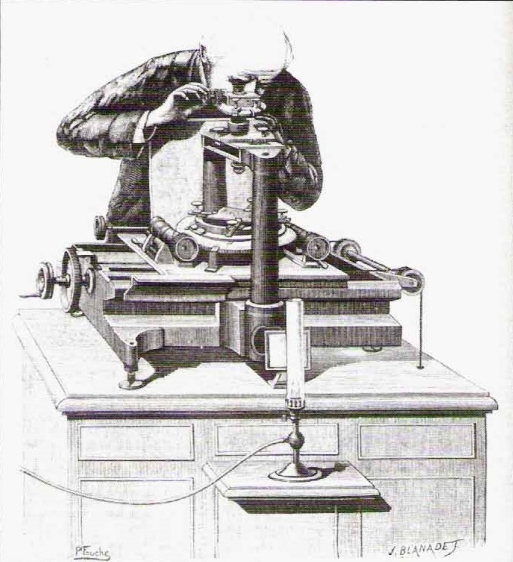
Macro-micrometer for measurements from astrophotographs

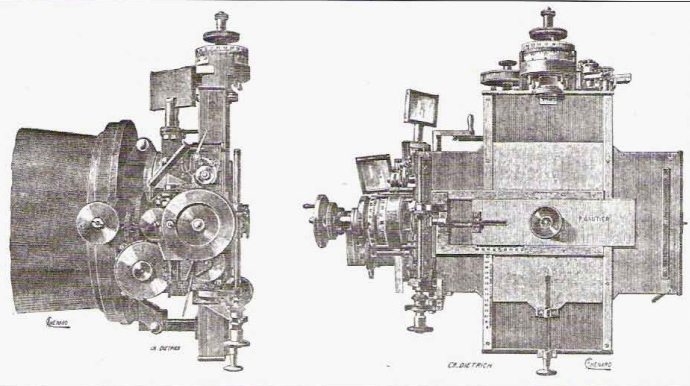
The "impersonal" micrometer

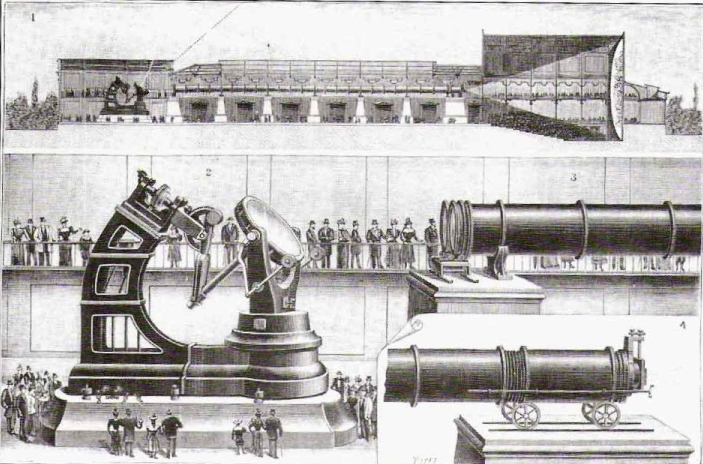
The refractor at the 1900 Paris exhibition
