= Lens sag =

Lens sag is a problem that sometimes afflicts very large refracting telescopes. It is the equivalent of mirror sag in reflecting telescopes. It occurs when the physical weight of the glass causes a distortion in the shape of the lens because the lens can only be supported by the edges. Making the lens thick enough to prevent deformation would cause it to absorb too much light to be useful. A mirror on the other hand can be effectively supported by the entire opposite face, making mirror sag much less of a problem. One expensive solution to lens sag is to place the telescope in orbit around the Earth.

The technical limit concerning lens sag was reached at the Yerkes refractor (1897) with an aperture of 40 in (100 cm). Hence the 1890s marked the high point of the great refractors era.
