= Astrograph =

Type of telescope

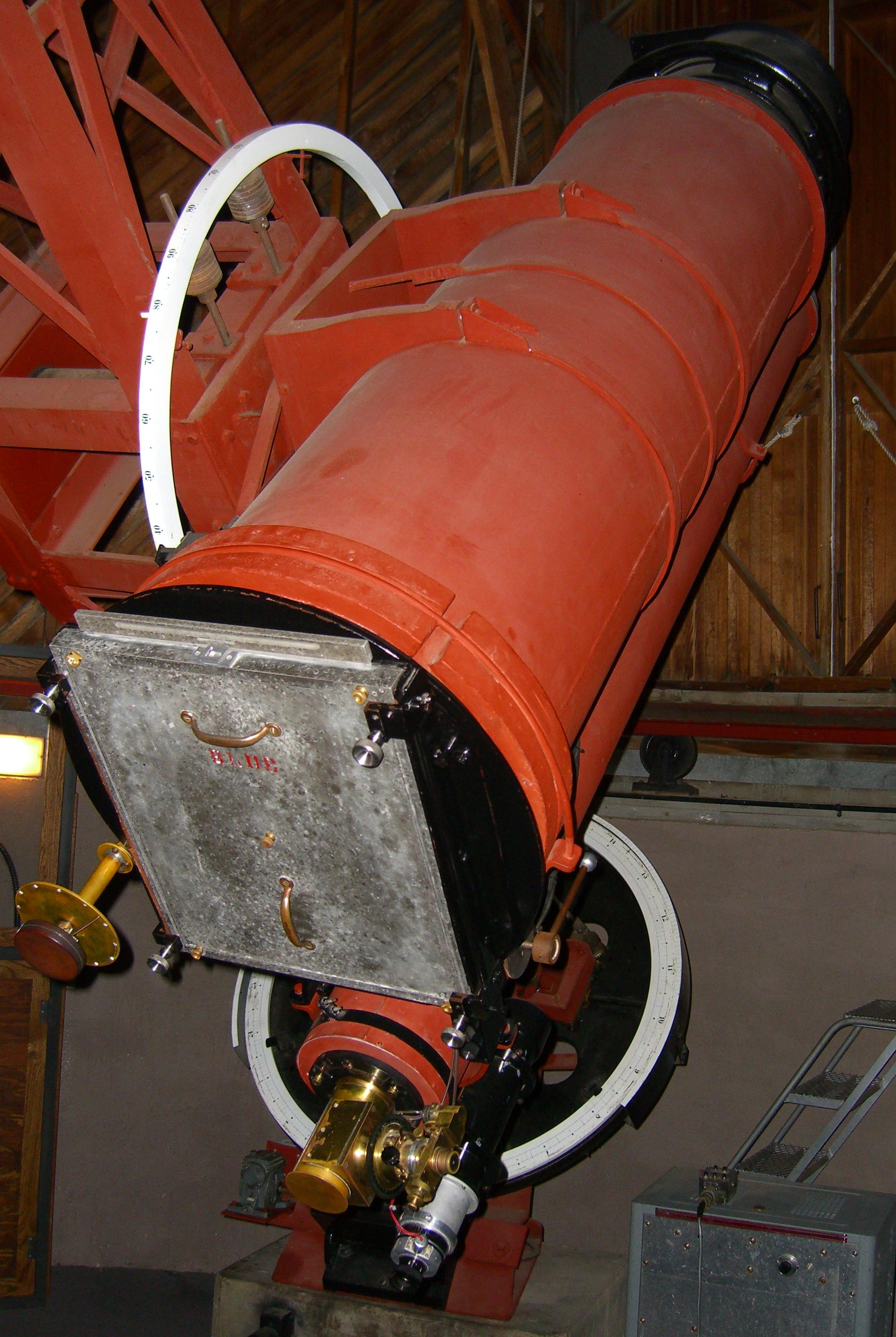
A 13-inch (330 mm), f/5.3 astrograph at Lowell Observatory (a refractor with a 3 element Cooke triplet lens) used in the discovery of Pluto.

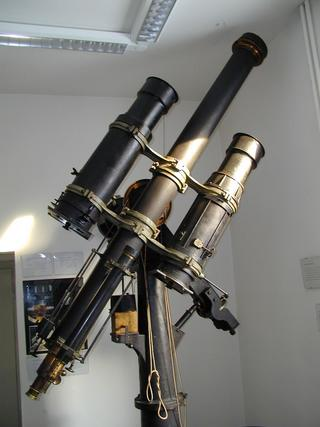
A double astrograph consisting of two 6-inch (150 mm) astrographs and a central guide scope on display at Landessternwarte Heidelberg-Königstuhl observatory.

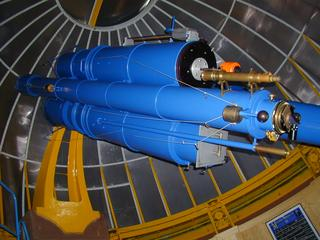
The Bruce double astrograph at the Landessternwarte Heidelberg-Königstuhl observatory.

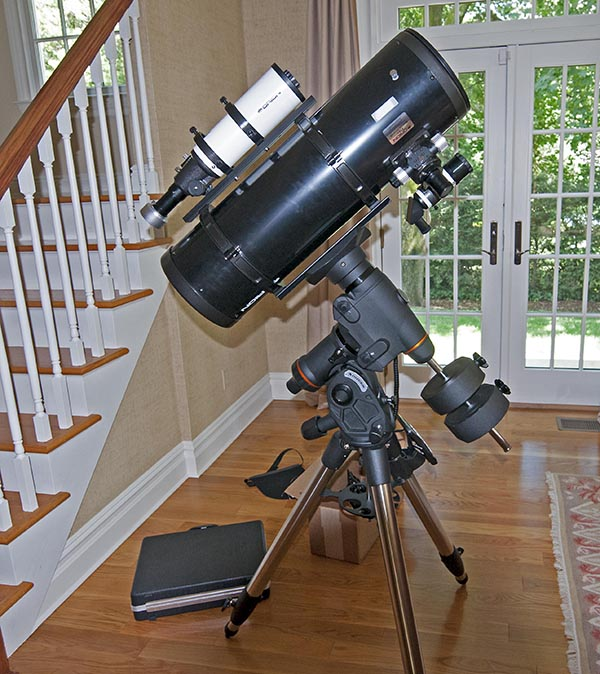
This is a modern amateur Newtonian astrograph, specifically designed for astrophotography.

An astrograph (or astrographic camera) is a telescope designed for the sole purpose of astrophotography. Astrographs are mostly used in wide-field astronomical surveys of the sky and for detection of objects such as asteroids, meteors, and comets.

Improvements in photography in the middle 19th century led to designs dedicated to astrophotography, and they were also popular in the 20th century. As in other photography, chemicals were used that respond to light, recorded on a glass photographic plate or sometimes on photographic film. Many observatories of this period used an astrograph, besides instruments like the transit telescope, great refractors, and chronometers, or instruments for Solar astronomy.

Astrographs were often used to make surveys of the night sky, and one of the famous projects was Carte du Ciel. Discoveries using an astrograph include then-planet Pluto. Rather than looking through the telescope, it was discovered by using a blink comparator with images taken by an astrograph.

By the late 20th century, electronic detectors became more common with the data being stored electronically.

== Design ==
Most research telescopes in this class are refractors, although there are many (usually larger) reflecting designs such as the Ritchey-Chrétien telescope and catadioptrics such as the Schmidt camera. The main parameters of an Astrograph are the diameter and F-number of the objective, which determine the field of view and image scale on the photographic plate or CCD detector. The objective of an astrograph is usually not very large, on the order of 20 to 50 cm (8 to 20 in).

The shape of the focal plane is often designed to work in conjunction with a specific shaped photographic plate or CCD detector. The objective is designed to produce a particularly large (for example, 17 by 17 inches (430 mm × 430 mm)), flat, and distortionless image at the focal plane. They may even be designed to focus certain wavelengths of light to match the type of film they are designed to use (early astrographs were corrected to work in blue wavelengths to match photographic emulsions of the time).

Wide-angle astrographs with short f-ratios are used for photographing a huge area of sky. Astrographs with higher f-ratios are used in more precise measurements. Many observatories of the world are equipped with the so-called normal astrographs with an aperture of around 13 inches (330 mm) and a focal length of 11 feet (3.4 m). The purpose of a "normal astrograph" is to create images where the scale of the image at the focal plane is a standard of approximately 60 arc minute/mm.

== Applications ==
=== Astrometry ===
Astrographs used in astrometry record images that are then used to "map" the positions of objects over a large area of the sky. These maps are then published in catalogs to be used in further study or to serve as reference points for deep-space imaging.

=== Stellar classification ===
Astrographs used for stellar classification sometimes consist of two identical telescopes on the same mount (a double astrograph). Each sky field can be simultaneously photographed in two colors (usually blue and yellow). Each telescope may have individually designed non-achromatic objectives to focus the desired wavelength of light which is paired with the respective color-sensitive (black-and-white) photographic plate. In other cases a single telescope is used to make two exposures of the same part of the sky with different filters and color sensitive film used on each exposure. Two-color photography lets astronomers measure the color, as well as the brightness (magnitude), of each star imaged. Colors tell the star's "temperature". Knowing the color type and magnitudes lets astronomers determine the distance of a star. Sky fields that are photographed twice, decades apart in time, will reveal a nearby star's proper motion when measured against the background of distant stars or galaxies.

=== Discovery of astronomical objects ===
By taking two exposures of the same section of the sky days or weeks apart, it is possible to find objects such as asteroids, meteors, comets, variable stars, novae, and even unknown planets. By comparing the pair of images, using a device such as a blink comparator, astronomers are able to find objects that moved or changed brightness between the two exposures or simply appear in one image only, as in the case of a nova or meteor. Sometimes objects can even be found in one exposure since a fast moving object will appear as a "line" in a long exposure.

One well-known case of an astrograph used in a discovery is Clyde Tombaugh's discovery of the dwarf planet Pluto in 1930. Tombaugh was given the job of hunting for a suspected "9th planet" to be achieved by systematically photographing the area of the sky around the ecliptic. Tombaugh used Lowell Observatory's 13-inch (330 mm) (3 lens element), f/5.3 refractor astrograph, which recorded images on 14-by-17-inch (360 mm × 430 mm) glass plates.

== Use in amateur astrophotography ==
In the amateur astronomy field, many types of commercial and amateur built telescopes are designed for astrophotography and labeled "astrographs". Optical designs of amateur astrographs vary widely but include apochromatic refractors, variations of Cassegrain reflectors, and Newtonian reflectors. Most optical designs do not produce large, flat, and well-corrected imaging fields and therefore require some type of optical correction by way of field flatteners or coma correctors. Amateur astrographs typically have purpose-built focusers, are constructed of thermally stable materials like carbon fiber, and are put on heavy duty mounts to facilitate accurate tracking of deep sky objects for long periods of time.

== See also ==
- BOOTES
- List of telescope types
