= François Deloncle =

French orientalist, journalist, diplomat and politician

Antoine Benoît François Deloncle
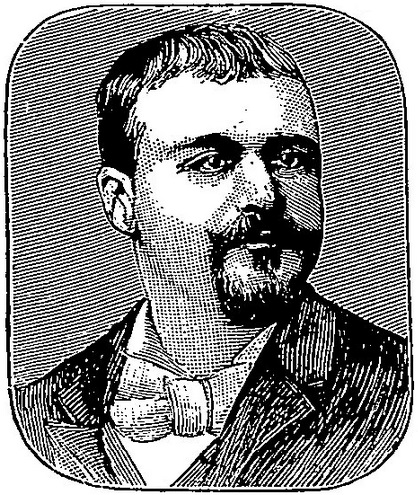
- Deloncle, député des Basses-Alpes, from La Chronique universelle artistique, politique, scientifique, littéraire illustrée March 1891

Deputy for Basses-Alpes
- In office 22 September 1889 – 31 May 1898

Deputy for Cochinchina
- In office 11 May 1902 – 31 May 1910

Deputy for Basses-Alpes
- In office 5 May 1912 – 31 May 1914

Personal details
- Born: 14 August 1856 Cahors, Lot, France
- Died: 21 October 1922 (aged 66) La Baule, Loire-Atlantique, France
- Occupation: Orientalist, journalist, diplomat, politician

Antoine Benoît François Deloncle (14 August 1856 – 21 October 1922) was a French orientalist, journalist, diplomat and politician who was Deputy for Basses-Alpes from 1889 to 1898, Deputy for Cochinchina from 1902 to 1910, and again Deputy for Basses-Alpes from 1912 to 1914. He was a member of the groupe colonial, in favour of expanding and consolidating the French colonial empire and opposed to the rival British Empire. He portrayed the British as oppressive despots compared to the civilized and tolerant French.

== Life ==
=== Family ===
François Deloncle was born on 14 August 1856 in Cahors, Lot. His family had provided many lawyers and judges to the Parliament of Toulouse. He was related to a Deputy of Côtes-du-Nord at the National Convention, great-grandson of a Deputy of Lot in 1809 and grandson of a president of the Cahors Court. His parents were Antoine Joseph Eugène Deloncle (1829–1887) and Anne Madeleine Adèle Caroline Joséphine Lathelize (born 1832). His elder brother Louis was a sea captain who was killed when his ship, the ocean liner La Bourgogne, sank in 1898. His younger brothers were the journalist Henri (1861–1898) and politician Charles Deloncle (1866–1938).

Eugène Deloncle was a university professor who had resigned after the 2 December 1851 coup d'état and had been deported to Algeria for refusing to take the oath. During the French Third Republic Eugène Deloncle was secretary to Charles de Freycinet in Tours and Bordeaux, prefect of Oran and then secretary general of the mayor of Lyon.

=== Early career ===
François Deloncle studied at the Faculty of Letters, and obtained a degree of Licencié ès-lettres. Deloncle then travelled in Algeria and Tunisia before studying at the École des langues orientales from 1873 to 1877, where he was appointed substitute professor of Hindustani. He published translations of Persian works. At the same time, he contributed to Le Courrier de France, La Paix, La Presse and La France. He was sent in turn as correspondent to the East, Russia, Germany, Austria, Italy and other countries. After the 16 May 1877 crisis he became secretary of the Committee of the Left, and published a Manual of Electoral Law.

Deloncle joined the office of Freycinet, now Minister of Foreign Affairs, on 29 January 1880. He was appointed Secretary 3rd class on 15 March 1881. Deloncle was appointed secretary to the Bucharest embassy in 1881, then returned to assist in the trade negotiations with Italy, Switzerland and England. On 14 November 1881 Léon Gambetta, President of the Council and Minister of Foreign Affairs, named Deloncle Chief of Staff to Eugène Spuller, Under-Secretary of State. In January 1881 Gambetta made him Consul 1st Class. (Note: The official Dictionary of Parliamentarians says Deloncle was not appointed Consul 1st Class until 26 July 1883.) During this period Deloncle was given several diplomatic missions as consul general.

Deloncle published many accounts of his journeys and missions, notably that to Burma. He was in turn Secretary of the Société de géographie and the Société des etudes maritimes at coloniales, and was founder of many philanthropic societies including the Association pour la défense des droits individuels.

Deloncle was sent on an official mission to India by Jules Ferry in 1883. His dispatches were embellished and enlivened by Octave Mirbeau and published under the pseudonym "Nirvana" in 11 instalments in Le Gaulois between 22 February and 22 April 1885. They take the form of 11 letters written by a traveller who visits Aden, Ceylon, the French colony of Pondicherry, Peshawar and Darjeeling. It is a work of propaganda, in which the anonymous author contrasts the brutal oppression of British colonialism with the civilized tolerance of the French.

On 10 July 1885 Deloncle was attached to the residence general at Huế and given charge of commercial negotiations with China. On 7 August 1885, when he was about to leave for China, he was instead appointed consul in Melbourne. He asked for a postponement due to his forthcoming marriage. On 7 September 1885 he married Léonie Claire Donnat in Paris. They divorced on 14 December 1904. On 26 December 1885 he turned down the offer of the position of Consul at Melbourne.

=== Deputy of Basses-Alpes (1) ===
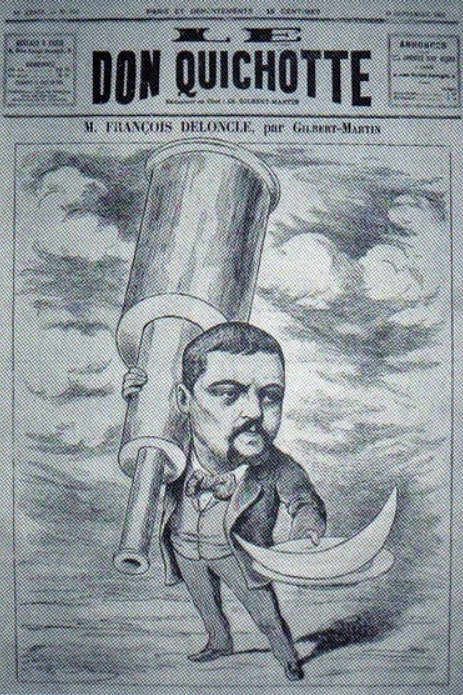
Cartoon of Deloncle and the Great Paris Exhibition Telescope of 1900

On 22 September 1889 Deloncle ran as Opportunist Republican candidate for the Castellane constituency of Basses-Alpes, and was elected in the first round by 2,391 votes out of 4,265. He sat with the democratic left group, and was a member of the committees on Customs and Review of Administrative Services. He specialized in foreign, colonial and customs issues, and was very active in the chamber. In 1890 he became director of the journal Le Siècle, where he mainly published articles on foreign policy issues. In the Chamber he was involved in discussion on improving trade relations between France and Greece and the Paris Universal Exposition of 1900. In 1892 Deloncle instigated construction of the Great Paris Exhibition Telescope of 1900, the largest refracting telescope ever constructed, as the centerpiece of the Paris Universal Exposition of 1900.

Deloncle was involved debates over the French settlements in Dahomey, the old treaties between France and the Sublime Porte of the Ottoman Empire, customs duties on maize and rice, the Sultanate of Zanzibar, the June 1890 commercial convention between China and England, the general tariff, the Brussels Conference Act of 1890, French colonization of Madagascar, events in Dahomey, the 1885 Monetary Agreement with Greece, Switzerland, Italy and Belgium, creation of a vice-consulate in Muscat, liquidation of the Universal Company of the Panama Interoceanic Canal, creation of diplomatic posts in Fez, Sierra Leone, Han-Kieou and Fort Dauphin. He also participated actively in budget discussions. On 30 June 1893 he was promoted to the rank of Minister Plenipotentiary.

Deloncle was reelected on 20 August 1893, holding office until 31 May 1898. He was unopposed, and won 3,939 votes out of 4,039. He was again mainly involved in colonial and foreign policy issues. He was rapporteur for bills to approve the 3 October 1893 treaty between France and Siam (Thailand), the 14 August 1894 agreement between France and the Congo Free State to delimit the Upper Ubangi (Ubangi-Shari) territories, the 4 June 1897 commercial agreement between France and Bulgaria, the 23 July 1897 convention to delimit German possessions in Togo and the 10 April 1897 convention to delimit the frontiers between French Guiana and Brazil.

On 25 August 1894 a delegation from the groupe colonial called on the Khedive Abbas in Geneva, where he was on a private visit. It was led by Eugène Étienne and Deloncle, who assumed the roles of spokesmen for the French government. They assured the Khedive that the French were determined to make another attempt to end the British occupation of Egypt, and asked him not to make any concessions to the British that would make their task harder. The Khedive was reassuring and encouraging.

Deloncle and Émile Flourens, both senior members of the groupe colonial, denounced "English dreams of African hegemony" while calling for a rapid advance by France to the Upper Nile. In March 1895 Deloncle visited Egypt, met the Khedive again and renewed his contacts with the "Young Egyptian" nationalists. He told them "England will have evacuated Egypt within ten months." He obtained control of the Journal Egyptien which he turned over to Aristide Gavillot, a wealthy French journalist and member of the Egyptian administration whom the British saw as a puppet of Deloncle. After his return to France Deloncle continued to denounce the "moral tyranny" of the British in Egypt.

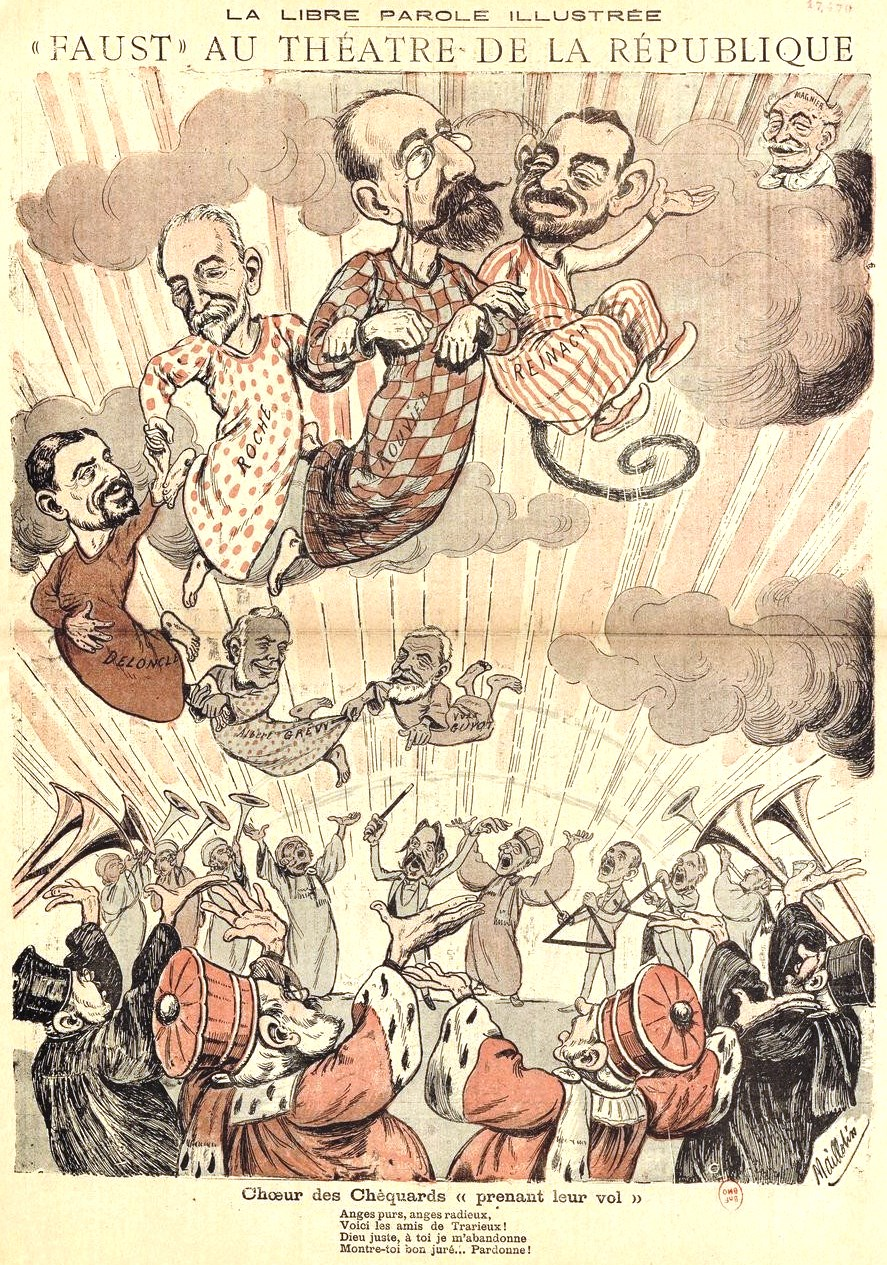
Faust at the Theater of the Republic: Choir of chéquards (Note: The chéquards were politicians and journalists accused of accepting bribes to hide the lack of progress, financial issues and corruption of the company building the Panama Canal.): Reinach, Rouvier, Roche, Deloncle, Grévy and Guyot. La Libre Parole illustrée, 21 September 1895

Deloncle was among the parliamentarians who were reported to have received cheques from Baron Reinach during the Panama scandals. He was also implicated in the Southern of France Railway affair. The New York Times described him as "the most industrious and persistent 'toucheur' in this malodorous 'galère'" and as a "noisy but insignificant personage whose political career is now at an end". In the general elections of 9 May 1898 he lost by 1,575 votes against 2,786 for Count Boni de Castellane.

=== Deputy of Cochinchina ===
Deloncle was elected to the Chamber of Deputies for Cochinchina on 11 May 1902. He replaced Charles Le Myre de Vilers. He was again involved in colonial and foreign affairs, and was very active in debates. He was a member of the Committees on Associations and Congregations, External Affairs, Protectorates and Colonies, Revision of the Civil Pensions Act of 1853 and Public Works. He spoke on approval of the 13 August 1902 commercial convention concerning the Dutch colonies, funding of the South Pole Scientific Expedition, protection of French interests in the Baghdad Railway Company and defense of Indochina. He was rapporteur for the bills to approve the 11 January 1902 agreement with Montenegro for protection of literary and artistic works, the 6 April 1904 convention with the Netherlands concerning submarine cables landing in the Netherlands Indies, the 13 February 1904 convention between France and Siam and the 15 February 1904 agreement with the Eastern Extension Australasia and China Telegraph company sale to the French Government of the cable from Saigon to Haiphong.

Deloncle was reelected on 6 May 1906 by 1,026 votes out of 1,858. He was rapporteur of bills to approve the 15 February 1907 convention between the government and the Compagnie française des chemins de fer de l'Indochine et du Yu-Nan, the 23 March 1907 treaty with Siam and the 18 April 1908 convention to clarify the border between the French Congo and the German Cameroons. He failed to be reelected on 24 April 1910, winning only 962 votes out of 2,131. He left office on 31 May 1910.

=== Deputy of Basses-Alpes (2) ===
In a by-election of 28 April 1912 to replace Justin Perchot^{(fr)}, who had become a senator, Deloncle was elected deputy for Castellane, Basses-Alpes, in the second round of votes on 5 May 1912. He was a member of the Committee on External Affairs. He was rapporteur on a convention for the concession of the Tangier-Fez railway. He was involved in discussions on foreign policy, events in the East, the Balkan Wars and reestablishing official diplomatic relations with the Holy See. He was active in budget debates and submitted various legislative proposals. Deloncle did not run in the general elections of 26 April 1914 and was replaced by Jacques Stern.

On 28 August 1920 Deloncle married Émilie Anne Renée Rousseau in Nantes. He died on 21 October 1922 in La Baule, Loire-Atlantique, aged 66. He was Knight of the Legion of Honour. Deloncle Bay on Graham Land, Antarctic, was charted by the French Antarctic Expedition of 1903–05 and named after Deloncle by Jean-Baptiste Charcot.

== Publications ==
Deloncle submitted numerous legislative proposals and reports. A selection of these and other publications includes:

- François Deloncle (1877), Guide pratique de propagande électorale, Paris: Impr. de Dubuisson
- François Deloncle (1889), Carte politique de l'Indo-Chine (Map scale : 1:3700000), Paris: F. Appel, Parrot et Cie
- François Deloncle (1893-03-21), Proposition de loi portant modification à certains articles des lois militaires (Chambre des Députés. 5e législature. Session 1891. N°1361), Paris: Motteroz, p. 151
- François Deloncle (1893-05-25), Proposition de résolution tendant à la distribution à la Chambre des Députés d'un rapport annuel du ministre des Affaires étrangères sur les actes de la Commission internationale de la Caisse de la dette publique d'Égypte (Chambre des Députés. 5e législature. Session 1893. N°2760), Paris: Motteroz, p. 55
- François Deloncle; Le Roy; Martineau; Saint-Germain (1893-06-03), Proposition de résolution tendant à la distribution à la Chambre des Députés d'un rapport du ministre des Affaires étrangères sur le fonctionnement de la réforme judiciaire en Égypte depuis la mise en vigueur de la loi du 24 février 1889 (Chambre des Députés. 5e législature. Session 1893. N°2785), Paris: Motteroz, p. 42
- François Deloncle (1896-02-01), Projet de résolution tendant à la distribution au Parlement des textes officiels de certains documents diplomatiques visés par la déclaration de Londres du 15 janvier 1896 (Chambre des Députés. 6e législature. Session 1896. N°1768), Paris: Motteroz, p. 24
- François Deloncle (1896-02-25), Interpellation de M. François Deloncle,... sur la déclaration de Londres du 15 janvier 1896 (Extrait du "Journal officiel de la République française"), Paris: Impr. des journaux officiels, p. 56
- François Deloncle (1902-12-06), Projet de résolution tendant à inviter le gouvernement à reviser le décret du 5 mai 1898 portant création d'une caisse locale de retraites en Indo-Chine (Chambre des Députés. 8e législature. Session extraordinaire 1902. N°628), Paris: impr. de Motteroz, p. 57
- François Deloncle (1903-03-02), Projet de résolution tendant à la publication de divers documents diplomatiques concernant les affaires d'Éthiopie (Chambre des Députés. 8e législature. Session 1903. N°790), Paris: impr. de Motteroz), p. 46
- François Deloncle (1904-10-21), Approbation de la convention conclue le 13 février 1904 entre le gouvernement de la République française et le gouvernement de S. M. le roi de Siam (Chambre des Députés. 8e législature. Session extraordinaire de 1904. N ° 1987), Paris: Impr. de Motteroz, p. 51
- François Deloncle (1904-10-21), Approbation d'une convention concernant Terre-Neuve et l'Afrique occidentale et centrale (Chambre des Députés. 8e législature. Session extraordinaire de 1904. N ° 1988), Paris: Impr. de Motteroz, p. 31
- Albert de Pouvourville (Matgioi) (1905), Les Défenses de l'Indo-Chine et la politique d'association, preface by François Deloncle, Paris: A. Pedone, p. 250

== Sources ==
- Bertrand, Alphonse (1893), "DELONCLE (François)", La Chambre de 1893: biographies des 581 députés (in French), chez Quantin
- "Deloncle Bay", GNIS: Geographic Names Information System, U.S. Department of the Interior – U.S. Geological Survey
- Dion, Isabelle, "Deloncle, François (1856-1922)", Auguste Pavie : L'explorateur aux pieds nus (in French), Archives nationales d’outre-mer (Aix-en-Provence)
- François Deloncle (in French), Assemblée nationale
- François Deloncle (1856-1922) (in French), BnF: Bibliotheque nationale de France
- Henry-Fonrouge, Liliane, "Antoine Benoît François DELONCLE", Geneanet (in French)
- Jolly, Jean, ed. (1960), "Deloncle (Antoine-Benoît-François)", Dictionnaire des parlementaires français de 1889 à 1940, Presses universitaires de France
- Launay, Françoise (2007), "The Great Paris Exhibition Telescope of 1900", Journal for the History of Astronomy, 38 (4): 459–475, doi:10.1177/002182860703800404, S2CID 119843249
- Michel, Pierre (2016), "LETTRES DE L'INDE", Le Dictionnaire Octave Mirbeau (in French), Société Octave Mirbeau
- Mollier, Jean-Yves (2 May 1991), Le Scandale de Panama (in French), Fayard, ISBN 978-2-213-64870-5
- Penrose, Ernest Francis (12 November 2012), European Imperialism and the Partition of Africa, Routledge, ISBN 978-1-136-27669-9
- Strong, Rowland (26 December 1897), "More Scandals in Paris : One That Involves Deloncle, Whose Place as a Deputy Count Boni Castellane Will Take" (PDF), New York Times
