= Great Paris Exhibition Telescope of 1900 =

Largest refracting telescope in history

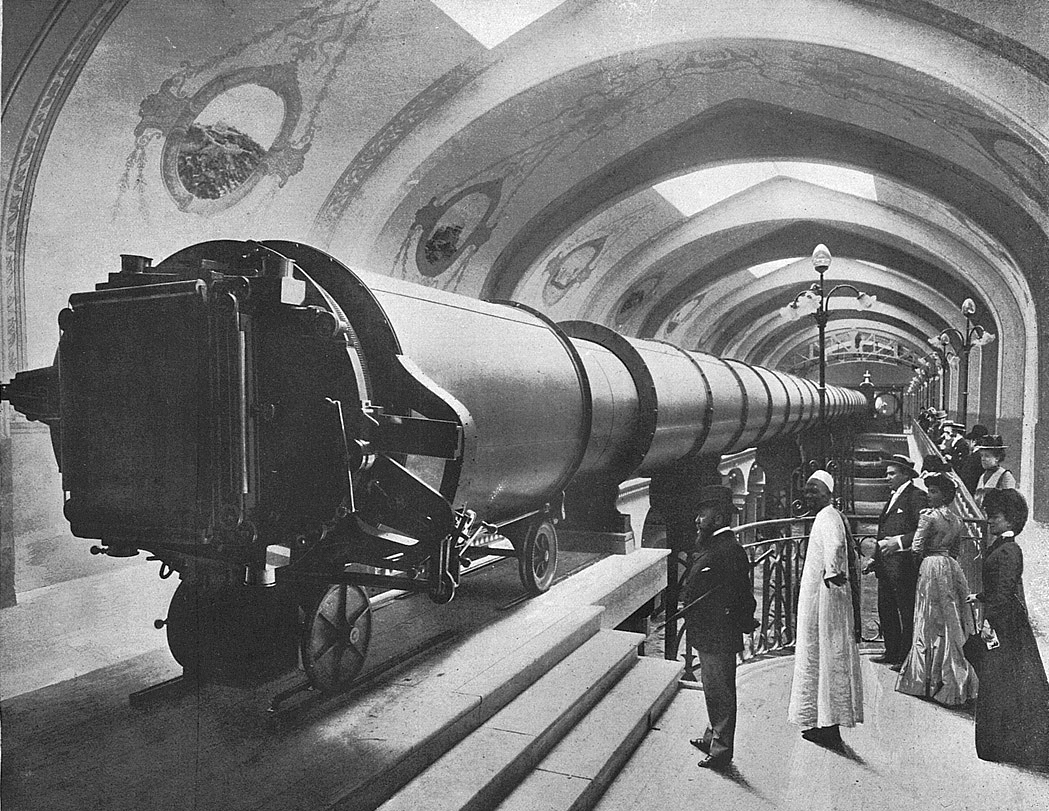
- The Great Telescope, installed, from the ocular lens end
- Location(s): France
- Coordinates: 48°52′N 2°17′E
- Focal length: 57 m (187 ft 0 in)
- Location of Great Paris Exhibition Telescope of 1900
- Related media on Commons

Comparison of nominal sizes of apertures of the Great Paris Exhibition Telescope of 1900 and some notable optical telescopes

The Great Paris Exhibition Telescope of 1900, with an objective lens of 1.25 m (49 in) in diameter, was the largest refracting telescope ever constructed. It was built as the centerpiece of the Paris Universal Exhibition of 1900. Its construction was instigated in 1892 by François Deloncle (1856–1922), a member of the French Chambre des Députés. Since it was built for exhibit purposes within a large metropolis, and its design made it difficult to aim at astronomical objects, it was not suited for scientific use.

When the year-long exposition was over, its builders were unable to sell it. It was ultimately broken up for scrap; the lenses are still stored away at the Paris Observatory.

== Design ==
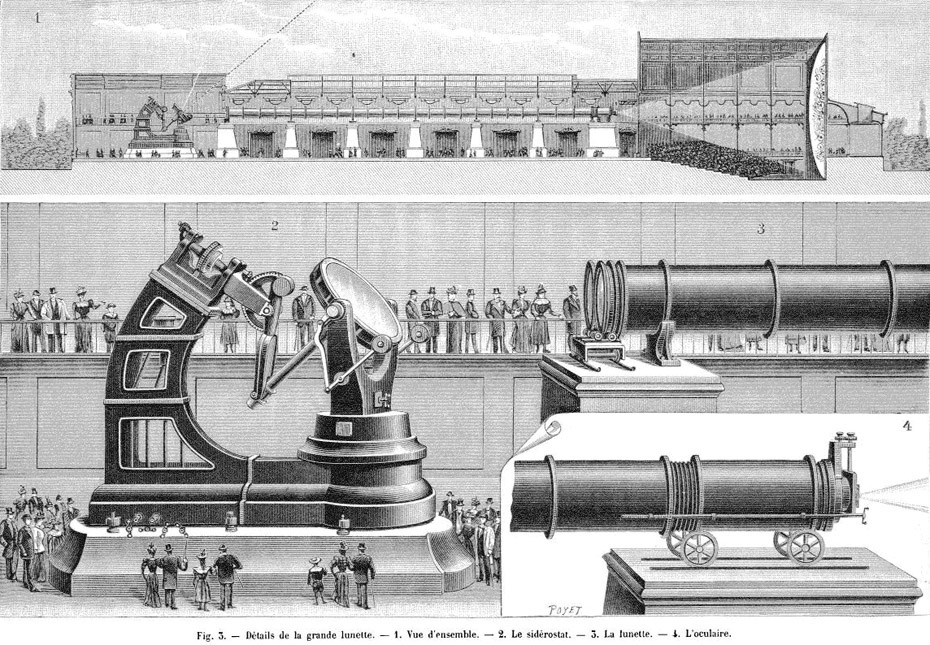
The telescope: overall side view (top); the siderostat (left) and lens tube (right); ocular lens end (inset)

The telescope had two interchangeable objective lenses (for visual and photographic use respectively) 1.25 m (49 in) in diameter, with a focal length of 57 m (187 ft). Due to its extremely large size, the telescope was mounted in a fixed horizontal position. Light from astronomical objects was redirected into the optical tube assembly via a Foucault siderostat, a movable plane mirror 2 m (6.6 ft) in diameter, mounted in a large cast-iron frame at the objective lens end of the telescope. The horizontal steel tube was 60 m (200 ft) long. The telescope's eyepiece/plate end could be shifted five feet on rails for focusing. With the lowest power of 500×, the field of view was 3 arc minutes.

== Construction of the telescope ==
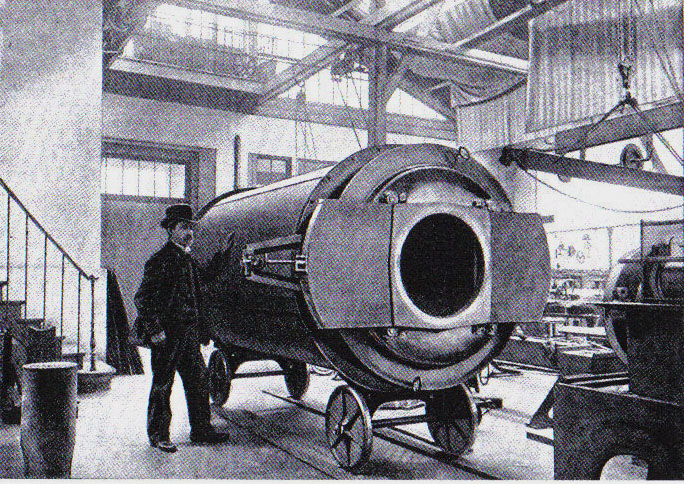
The eye-piece holder

The mirror for the siderostat was ground mechanically by the Gautier Company (headed by Paul Gautier, 1842–1909) and took nine months to finish. The blank for the mirror was cast by Georges Despret, director of the Jeumont glassworks in northern France. The lens blanks were cast by Édouard Mantois (1848–1900) and ground by Gautier. By the time the Paris Exhibition opened only the object lens for photographic observation was ready. The visual object lens, unfinished, was put on display nearby.

== Erection of the telescope ==
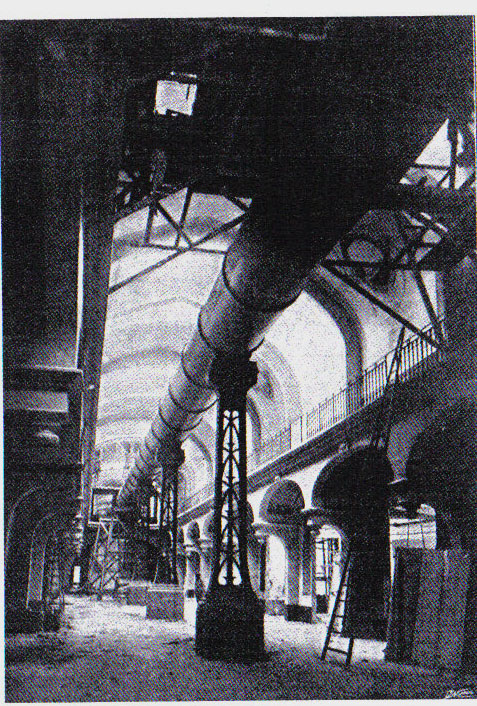
The instrument in place

The telescope was erected in the Palais de l’Optique on the Champ de Mars, near the Eiffel Tower. The tube, oriented north-south, was made up of 24 cylinders 1.5 m (59 in) in diameter and rested on 7 concrete and steel pillars; its axis was 7 m (23 ft) above the floor. The room at the end which housed siderostat with the mirror had a movable dome to allow direct access to the sky.

== Scientific observations ==
A few scientific observations were made using the giant telescope, even though it was not designed for scientific use. Théophile Moreux (1867–1954) observed sunspots through the telescope and made drawings of them. And Eugène Michel Antoniadi (1870–1944) made several drawings of nebulae. As well several large photographs of the surface of the Moon, made by Charles Le Morvan (1865–1933), were published in the Strand Magazine, November 1900.

== Aftermath ==
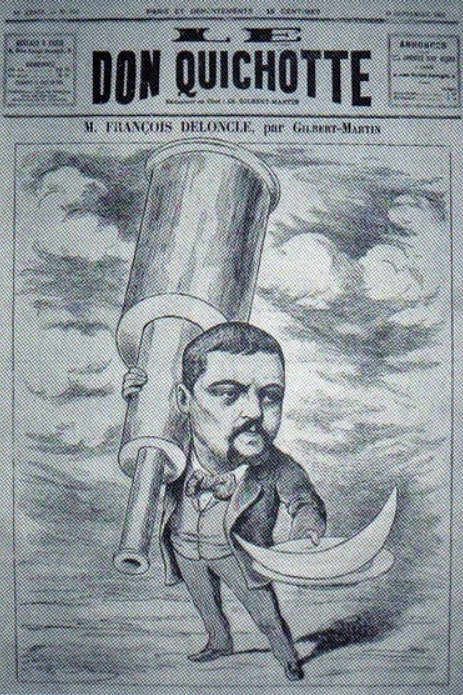
An 1892 cartoon ridiculing François Deloncle, who proposed the project

The company which had organized in 1886 to build the telescope declared bankruptcy after the Expo, and the telescope was put up for auction in 1909. No buyer was found and eventually the components were scrapped. The 2-metre (6.6 ft) diameter mirror is on display at the Observatoire de Paris, and two of the lenses have recently been discovered in packing crates in the basement.

Poor optics were not why the telescope did not work well. The telescope was located at a fair with much light pollution and near a very large city with much air pollution, and near sea level. The tube was not ventilated and the air inside was likely humid. Throughout its existence, the telescope was the butt of many derisive jokes and unflattering cartoons. In part this was due to the belief of the academic community that the telescope would be completely useless. As the centrepiece of an exhibition showcasing the best of the recent advances in industry and technology, it nonetheless served a purpose.

== Bibliography ==
- Paul Gautier, “Note sur le sidérostat à lunette de 60 m de foyer et de 1,25 m d’ouverture,” in Annuaire du Bureau des Longitudes pour 1899 (Paris, 1898), pp. C1–C26.
- Françoise Launay, “The Great Paris Exhibition Telescope of 1900”, Journal for the History of Astronomy, 38 (2007), 459–475.

== See also ==
- List of largest optical refracting telescopes
- List of largest optical telescopes historically
