= Non-achromatic objective =

A non-achromatic objective is an objective lens which is not corrected for chromatic aberration. In telescopes they can be pre-18th century simple single element objective lenses which were used before the invention of doublet achromatic lenses. They can also be specialty monochromatic lenses used in modern research telescopes and other instruments.

== Non-achromatic telescope objectives ==
=== Early non-achromatic objectives ===
Early telescope objectives, such as those built by Johannes Hevelius and Christiaan Huygens and his brother Constantijn Huygens, Jr., utilized single small (2"-8") positive lenses with enormous focal lengths (up to 150 feet in length in tube telescopes and up to 600 feet in non-tube aerial telescopes). This allowed the observer to use higher magnification while limiting the interfering rainbow halos caused by chromatic aberration (the uncorrected chromatic aberration fell within the large diffraction pattern at focus).

=== Modern non-achromatic objectives ===
Modern instruments may use a non-achromatic objective lens which is well-corrected for spherical aberration and off-axis aberrations such as coma and astigmatism over the desired field of view at only one wavelength. Monochromatically corrected objectives can be found in solar telescopes working with narrow spectral lines such as the hydrogen alpha spectral line of 0.6562725 micrometres. They are also used in astrographic telescopes where multiple single narrow wavelength images are used in stellar classification.

== Other applications ==
Non-achromatic objectives are also used in monochromatic laser applications such as collimators, beam expanders, and highly corrected pupil imaging for wavefront error sensors for adaptive optics.

== See also ==
- List of telescope types
