= S Coronae Borealis =

Star in the constellation Corona Borealis

- S Coronae Borealis (S CrB) imaged on 4 July 2026 with a Unistellar 114mm smart telescope

Observation data Epoch J2000 Equinox ICRS
- Constellation: Corona Borealis
- Right ascension: 15^{h} 21^{m} 23.9561^{s}
- Declination: +31° 22′ 02.573″
- Apparent magnitude (V): 5.3 – 13.6

Characteristics
- Spectral type: M7e
- U−B color index: 0.36
- B−V color index: 1.71
- Variable type: Mira

Astrometry
Radial velocity (R_{v})	−5.12 km/s
Proper motion (μ)	RA: −7.73 mas/yr Dec.: −13.03 mas/yr
Parallax (π)	2.39±0.17 mas
Distance	418+21 −18 pc
Absolute magnitude (M_{V})	−0.8±0.3

Details
Mass	1.34 M_{☉}
Radius	308 (537–664) R_{☉}
Luminosity	5,897 L_{☉}
Temperature	2,864 (2,350–2,600) K

Other designations
- S Coronae Borealis, HD 136753, BD+31°2725, HIP 75143, GC 20662, SAO 64652, GSC 02563-01338, DO 15223, AAVSO 1517+31

Database references
SIMBAD	data

S Coronae Borealis (S CrB) is a Mira variable star in the constellation Corona Borealis located about 1,400 light-years away. Its apparent magnitude varies between 5.3 and 13.6, with a period of 360 days, representing about a 2000–fold change in brightness. Within the constellation, it lies to the west of Theta Coronae Borealis, and around 1 degree southeast of the eclipsing binary star U Coronae Borealis. When it is near its maximum brightness, it can be seen with the naked eye, under good observing conditions.

With a typical local maximum magnitude around 7, S Coronae Borealis' is on average brighter than T Coronae Borealis or W Coronae Borealis.

== Variability ==
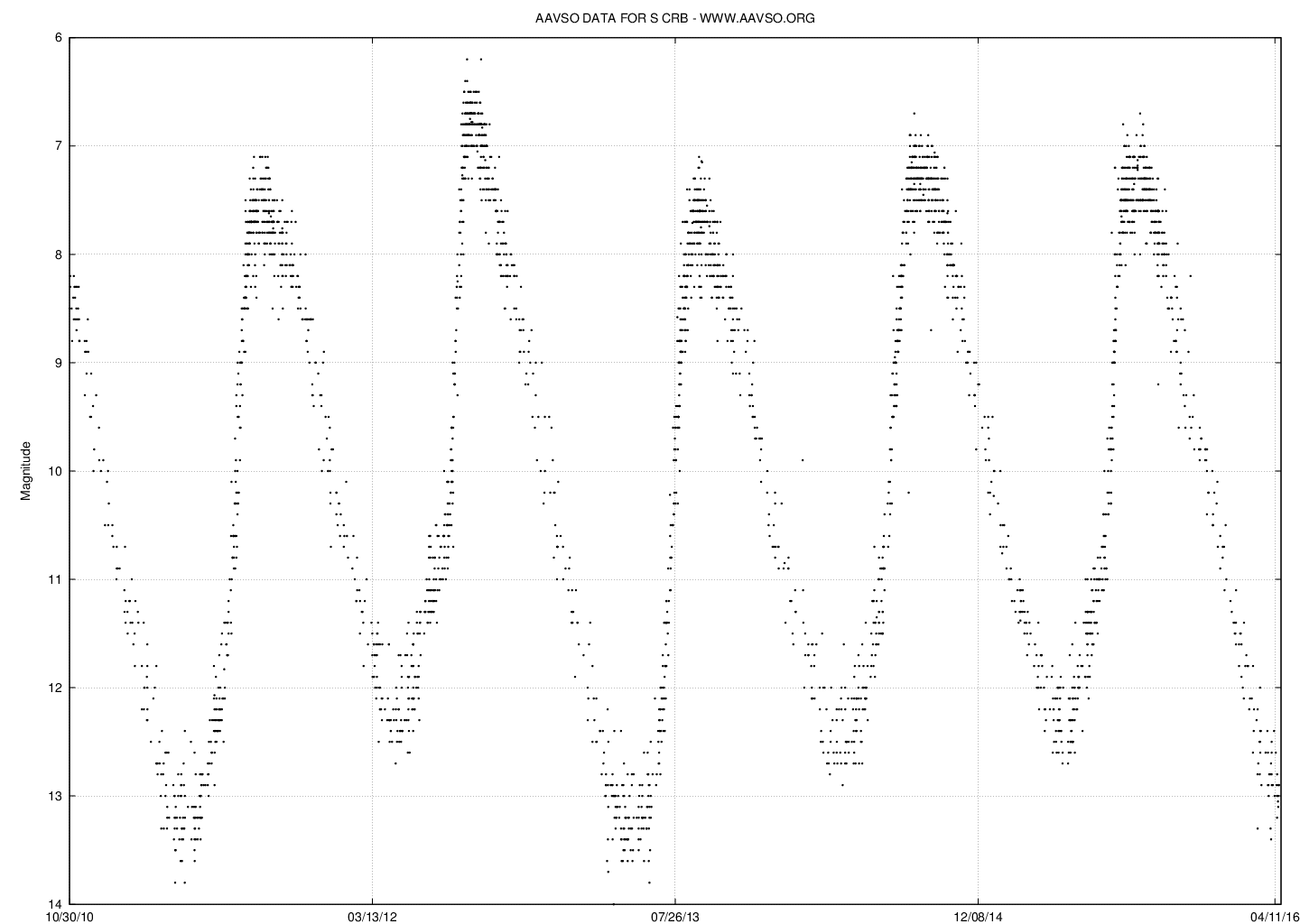
Light curve for the Mira variable S Coronae Borealis over six years

S Coronae Borealis was discovered to vary in brightness by German amateur astronomer Karl Ludwig Hencke in 1860. It was classified as a long period variable star as other similar objects were discovered, and later as a Mira variable. The maximum range of variation is from magnitude 5.3 to 13.6 although individual maxima and minima can vary in brightness. The period of 360 days is fairly predictable.

== Properties ==
S Coronae Borealis is a cool red giant on the asymptotic giant branch (AGB). It pulsates, which causes its radius and temperature to change. One calculation found a temperature range of 2,350 K to 2,600 K, although a more modern calculation gives a temperature of 2,864 K. Similarly a calculation of the varying radius gives 537 to 664 R_{☉} although a modern calculation of the radius gives 308 R_{☉}. The bolometric luminosity varies much less than the visual magnitude and is estimated to be 5,623 L_{☉}. Its parallax has been measured by very-long-baseline interferometry (VLBI), yielding a result of 2.39±0.17 mas, which converts to a distance of 1,300±100 light-years.

The masses of AGB stars are poorly known and cannot be calculated from their physical properties, but they can be estimated using asteroseismology. The pulsations of S Coronae Borealis lead to a mass estimate of 1.34 times that of the Sun.
