= Nu Coronae Borealis =

The Bayer designation ν Coronae Borealis (Nu Coronae Borealis) is an optical pair of stars in the constellation Corona Borealis:

- ν^{1} Coronae Borealis
- ν^{2} Coronae Borealis

As of 2011, the pair had an angular separation of 5.91′ along a position angle of 164°.
