= NGC 6109 =

Galaxy in the constellation Corona Borealis

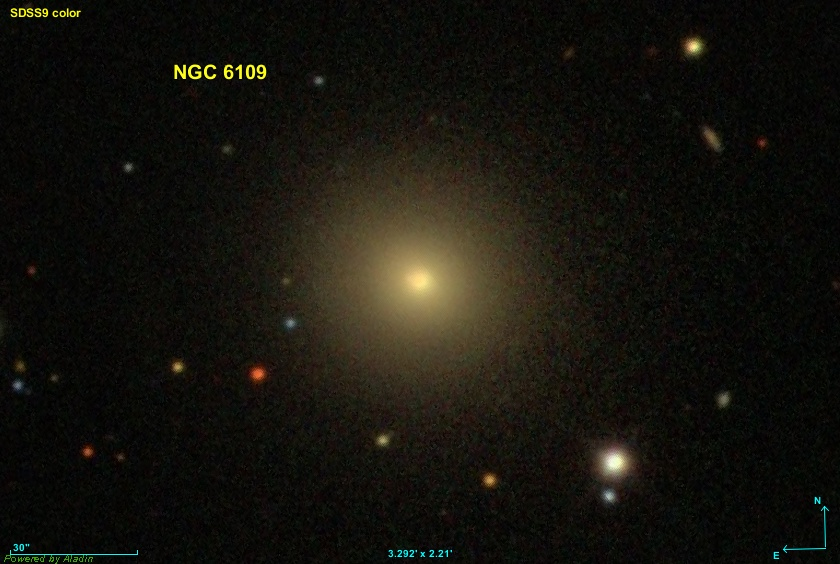
- The radio galaxy NGC 6109.

Observation data (J2000 epoch)
- Constellation: Corona Borealis
- Right ascension: 16^{h} 17^{m} 40.54^{s}
- Declination: +35° 00′ 15.38″
- Redshift: 0.029815
- Heliocentric radial velocity: 8938 km/s
- Distance: 487 Mly (149.33 Mpc
- Apparent magnitude (V): 13.0

Characteristics
- Type: E/S0; BrCLG, LERG LINER
- Size: ~188,000 ly (57.5 kpc) (estimated)

Other designations
- UGC 10316, 4C +35.40, CoNFIG 245, CGCG 196-026, PGC 57748, GIN 558, NSA 043838, MCG +06-36-016, NVSS J161738+350048, RX J1617.6+3501

NGC 6109 is a lenticular galaxy and a LINER galaxy located in the constellation of Corona Borealis. It is located 487 million light-years from Earth with redshift of (z) 0.029. It was discovered by French astronomer Édouard Stephan on July 7, 1880, who depicted the galaxy as a small round faint object.

== Description ==
NGC 6109 is classified as a Fanaroff-Riley Class Type I radio galaxy with an active galactic nucleus. A member of a poor galaxy cluster ZW 1615.8+3505, it contains a strong head-tail radio source. When observed with the Very Long Baseline Array (VLBA), the galaxy is mainly dominated by radio emission, with a tail-like structure that is extending towards the northwest direction by about 250 kiloparsecs in extent. Two other background sources are present; one being superimposed on the tail and the other located at the end of the tail. Studies have also indicated the presence of X-ray emission, depicted as point-like and originating from its main nucleus.

There is a jet present in NGC 6109. When observed, the jet is noted to display a collimated appearance on the northwest side of the core region and also shown to be bright for 5 arcseconds before dimming away. Within the fainter region the jet's opening angle increases and radio emission that is bending towards the direction of north then subsequently towards west. At the southeast of its radio core, a counter-jet is present with the emission evidently shown as fainter at a center of a component thus giving it the appearance of a doughnut. The spectral index of the core is estimated to be 0.05 ± 0.01.

NGC 6109 is a low-luminosity radio galaxy. It has a south-eastern component in which a steep spectrum is noted mainly in linear polarization that is located at the leading edge of the source. Polarization is also varying between 10-30% in both the source's head and the low-brightness part at the end of the tail structure. A central supermassive black hole mass was calculated to be 8.56 M_{☉}.

== Supernovae ==
Two supernovae have been discovered in NGC 6109.

- SN 2003ia (Type Ia, mag. 17.2) was discovered by Kōichi Itagaki via unfiltered CCD imaging on 15 September 2003.
- SN 2010an (Type Ia, mag. 17.0) was discovered by the Lick Observatory Supernova Search (LOSS) on 11 March 2010.
