= NGC 6104 =

Barred spiral galaxy in the constellation Corona Borealis

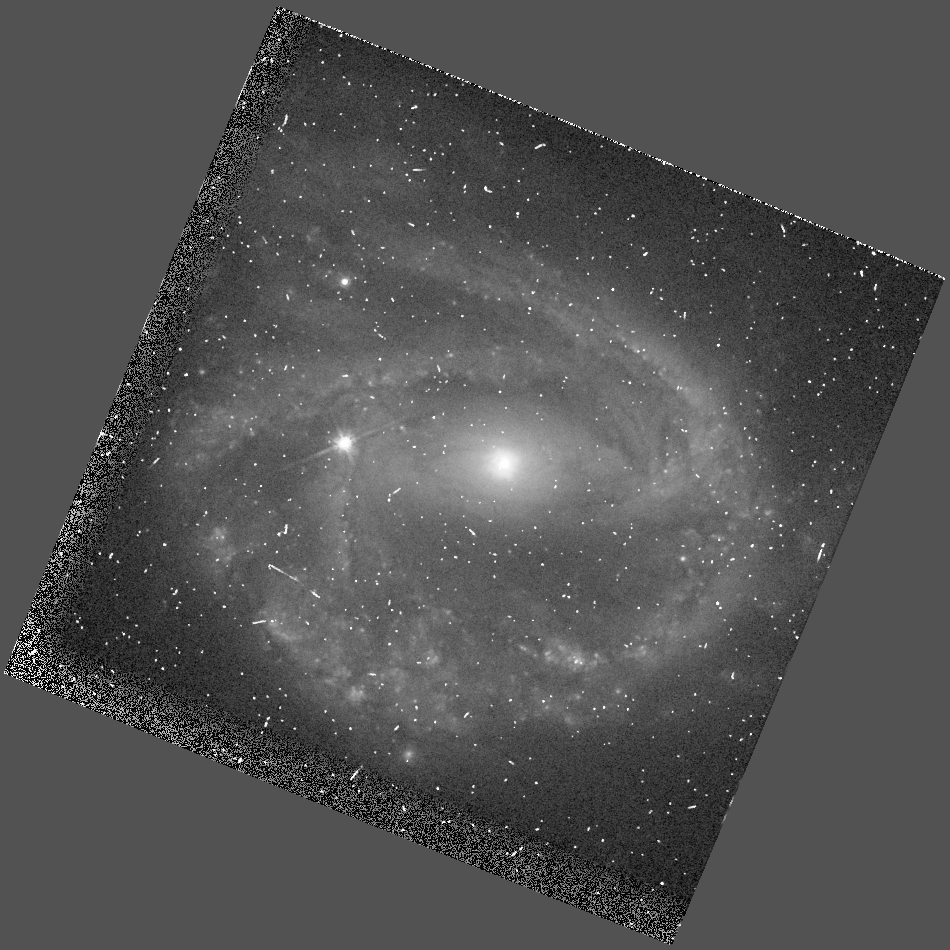
- NGC 6104 as seen through the Hubble Space Telescope

Observation data (J2000 epoch)
- Constellation: Corona Borealis
- Right ascension: 16^{h} 16^{m} 30.7^{s}
- Declination: +35° 42′ 29″
- Redshift: 0.028116±0.000100
- Heliocentric radial velocity: 8429±30 km/s
- Galactocentric velocity: 8573±31 km/s
- Distance: 387.5 million light-years (118 million parsecs)
- Apparent magnitude (V): 12.933
- Absolute magnitude (V): -22.65

Characteristics
- Type: SB(R)Pec
- Size: ~ 90,000 light-years
- Apparent size (V): 1.80′ × 10.7′

Other designations
- IRAS 16146 + 3549, MCG 6-36-11, PGC 57684, UGC 10309 and ZWG 196.20
- References: NASA/IPAC extragalactic datatbase, http://spider.seds.org/, http://cseligman.com

NGC 6104 is a barred spiral galaxy located in the constellation Corona Borealis. It is designated as S(R)Pec in the galaxy morphological classification scheme, though it is clearly a barred spiral (deserving of the SB(R)Pec designation). It was discovered by German-British astronomer William Herschel on 16 May 1787. The galaxy is approximately 388 million light-years away.

== Supernovae ==
Two supernovae have been observed in NGC 6104:

- SN 2002de (Type Ia, mag. 16) was discovered by LOTOSS (Lick Observatory and Tenagra Observatory Supernova Searches) on 1 June 2002.
- SN 2019svd (Type Ib/c, mag. 19.3466) was discovered by the Zwicky Transient Facility on 19 October 2019.

== See also ==
- List of NGC objects (6001–7000)
- List of NGC objects
