= OGC 1304 =

Galaxy in the constellation Corona Borealis

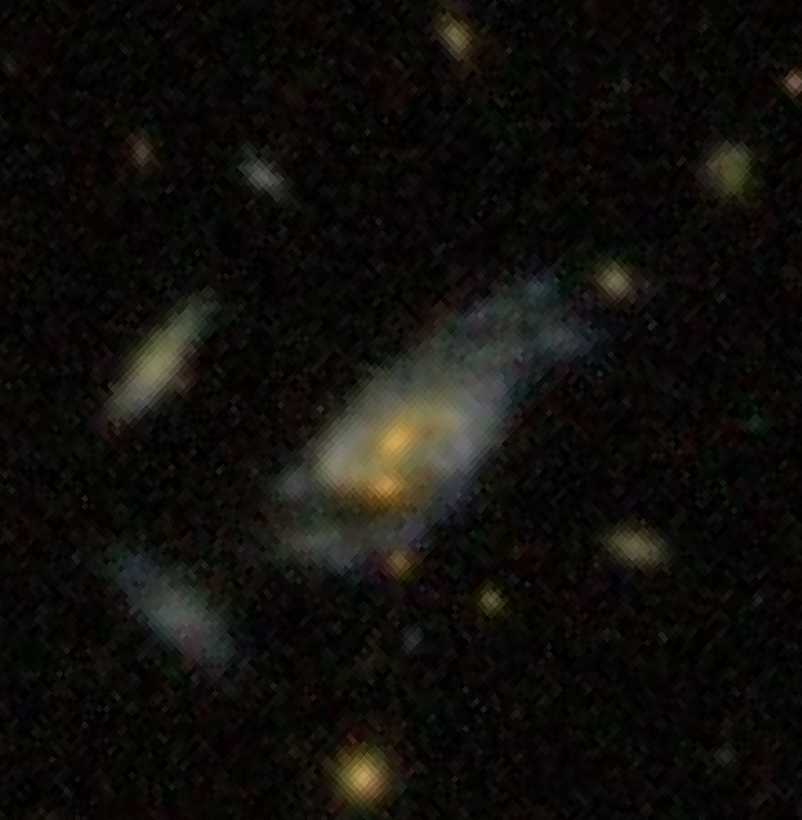
- SDSS image of OGC 1304

Observation data (J2000.0 epoch)
- Constellation: Corona Borealis
- Right ascension: 16^{h} 01^{m} 40.62^{s}
- Declination: +27° 18′ 15.83″
- Redshift: 0.164398
- Heliocentric radial velocity: 49,285 ± 6 km/s
- Distance: 2,376.6 ± 166.4 Mly (728.67 ± 51.01 Mpc)
- Group or cluster: GMBCG J240.41924+27.30444
- magnitude (J): 14.29

Characteristics
- Type: BrCIG
- Size: ~432,300 ly (132.55 kpc) (estimated)

Other designations
- 2MASX J16014061+2718161, KUG 1559+274, SDSS J160140.61+271815.9, PGC 56730, GMBCG J240.41924+27.30444 BCG, ASK 328711.0

OGC 1304 also known as 2MASX J16014061+2718161, is a massive spiral galaxy located in the constellation of Corona Borealis. The redshift of the galaxy is (z) 0.164 and it is categorized as a super spiral galaxy; a class of spirals considered to be larger and more distant compared to the Milky Way.

== Description ==
OGC 1304 is the brightest cluster galaxy (BCG) of the galaxy cluster, GMBCG J240.41924+27.30444. The appearance of the galaxy is disturbed, with distorted spiral structure components and further evidence of two bulges being present, indicating an ongoing galaxy merger. The galaxy is also confirmed to be located inside a dense galaxy environment, with several satellite galaxies detected within its position. There are also detections of hydrogen-alpha emission in its optical spectrum.

The total isophotal diameter of the galaxy is measured to be 82.3 kiloparsecs. The bulge fraction ratio has been estimated as B/T = 0.04, with the galactic disk displaying an inclination of 59° and orientated at the position angle of 180°. The disk exponential scale length is estimated to be R_{d} = 11.43. The inclination angle of the galaxy is 60°, while the position angle of the galaxy's major axis is 116°.

A star formation rate of 1.37 M_{☉} per year has been estimated for the galaxy based a 12 micrometer band system by the Wide-field Infrared Survey Explorer, with a gas mass of 10.6 M_{☉}. The total stellar mass of the stars is 11.63 M_{☉} via an estimation of the W-1 band luminosity. The maximum deprojected speed of the galaxy has been found to be v_{max} = 453 kilometers per seconds.
