= NGC 6122 =

Galaxy in the constellation Corona Borealis

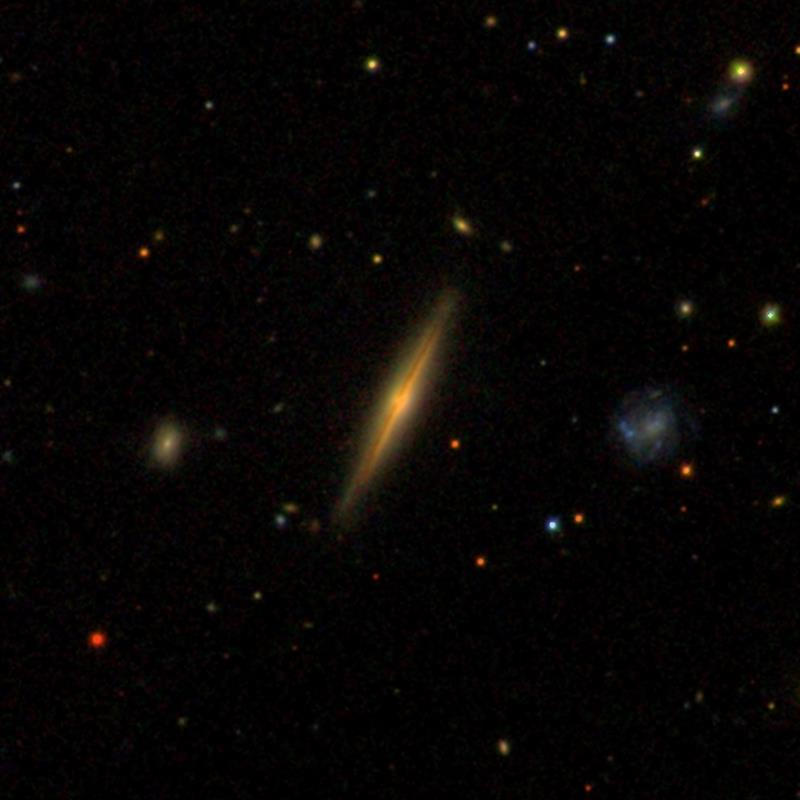
- A Sloan Digital Sky Survey (SDSS) image of NGC 6122

Observation data (J2000 epoch)
- Constellation: Corona Borealis
- Right ascension: 16^{h} 20^{m} 09.40^{s}
- Declination: +37° 47′ 54.00″
- Redshift: 0.03347±0.00001
- Distance: 484 Mly (148.54 Mpc)
- Apparent magnitude (V): 14.6

Characteristics
- Type: Sb
- Size: 211,000 ly
- Apparent size (V): 1.096′ × 0.257′
- Notable features: N/A

Other designations
- PGC 57858, LEDA 57858, MCG+06-36-032

NGC 6122 is a spiral galaxy located around 484 million light-years away in the constellation Corona Borealis. NGC 6122 was discovered on May 6, 1886 by the astronomer Guillaume Bigourdan, and its diameter is 211,000 light-years. NGC 6122 is not known to have much star-formation, and does not have an active galactic nucleus.

== Supernova ==
One supernova has been observed in NGC 6122:

- SN 2003ge (Type Ia, mag. 17.8) was discovered by astronomers Tim Puckett and Alex Langoussis on June 21, 2003. It was located 8".8 west and 0".1 north of the nucleus.
