= Markarian 493 =

Seyfert galaxy located in Corona Borealis

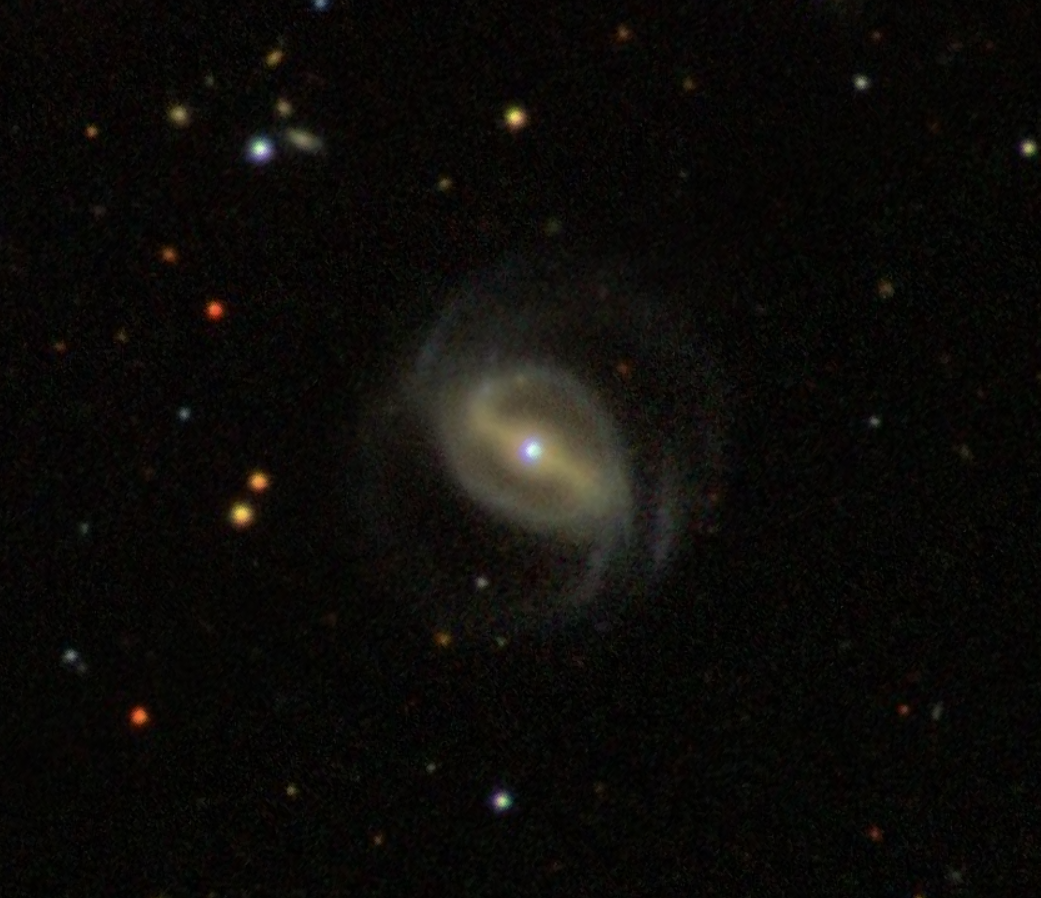
- The Seyfert galaxy Markarian 493.

Observation data (J2000 epoch)
- Constellation: Corona Borealis
- Right ascension: 15^{h} 59^{m} 09.62^{s}
- Declination: +35° 01′ 47.50″
- Redshift: 0.031503
- Heliocentric radial velocity: 9445 ± 3 km/s
- Distance: 447 Mly
- Apparent magnitude (V): 15.06
- Apparent magnitude (B): 15.69

Characteristics
- Type: SB (r)b, Sy1
- Size: ~77,900 ly (23.88 kpc) (estimated)

Other designations
- 2MIG 2183, CGCG 195-003, KIG 0719, UGC 10120, PGC 56573, RBS 1545, SRFS 350, NVSS J155910+350145

Markarian 493 or UGC 10120, is an active Seyfert galaxy of type 1 located in the constellation of Corona Borealis. The redshift of the galaxy is (z) 0.031 and it was first discovered in the radio survey by astronomers in November 1980.

== Description ==
Markarian 493 is depicted as a face-on barred spiral galaxy of type SBb. The morphology of the galaxy is very similar to something like MRK 42, with a bright central nucleus present and star formation regions in a form of a tightly wound spiral. Imaging also showed a bar and ring structure is present in the galaxy.

The nucleus of Markarian 493 is active and it has been categorized as a narrow-line Seyfert galaxy based on its spectrum. When observed with the Very Large Array (VLA), the source of the galaxy is mainly weak with a component that is unresolved. There is minimal optical polarization of 26%. In 2024, a central component is located with it being mainly surrounded by emission that is faint and extended. There is also a core component with a steep flux spectrum at 9 GHz frequencies.

A study published in 2008, has found the presence of a circumnuclear ring inside its central region. The ring has a total radius of between 350 and 500 parsecs with traces of continuum emission originating from emission-line gas. The star formation rate inside the ring is calculated to be around 2 M_{☉} per year, with a Hydrogen-alpha luminosity being 6.7 × 10^{41} erg s^{−1}. In addition, there are multiple dust spiral arms located outside the ring region. The central supermassive black hole for this galaxy is estimated to be 1.5 × 10^{6} M_{☉}.
