= RS Coronae Borealis =

Semiregular variable star in the constellation Corona Borealis

Observation data Epoch J2000.0 Equinox ICRS
- Constellation: Corona Borealis
- Right ascension: 15^{h} 58^{m} 30.764^{s}
- Declination: +36° 01′ 19.72″
- Apparent magnitude (V): 8.7-11.6

Characteristics
- Evolutionary stage: AGB
- Spectral type: M7

Astrometry
Proper motion (μ)	RA: −51.649 mas/yr Dec.: −0.161 mas/yr
Parallax (π)	3.0363±0.0272 mas
Distance	1,074 ± 10 ly (329 ± 3 pc)
Absolute magnitude (M_{V})	−0.21

Other designations
- RS CrB, BD+36°2672, HD 143347, HIP 78235, SAO 64995

Database references
SIMBAD	data

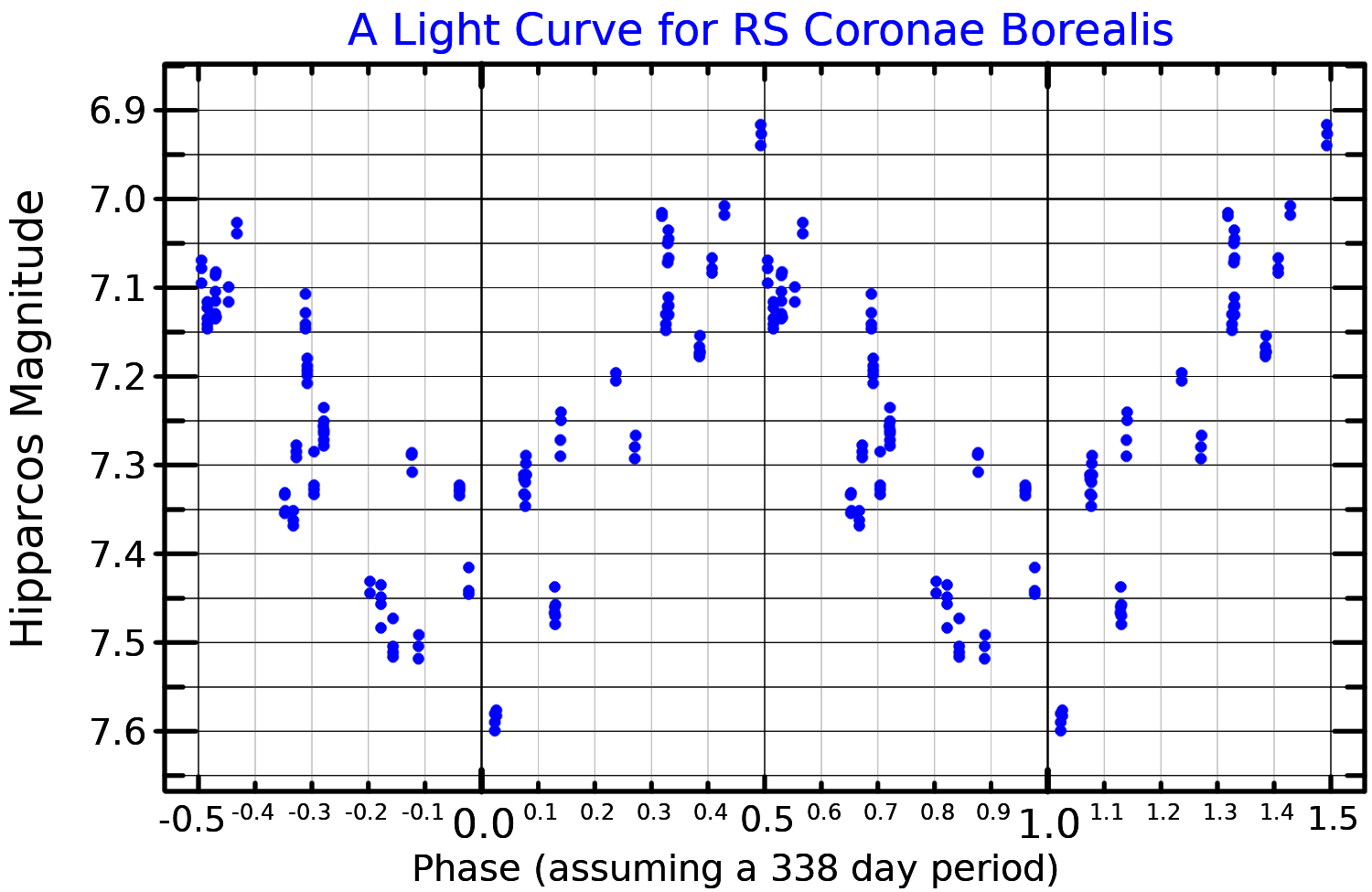
A light curve for RS Coronae Borealis, plotted from Hipparcos data

RS Coronae Borealis is a semiregular variable star located in the constellation Corona Borealis with a parallax of 2.93mas being a distance of 341 parsecs (1,110 ly). It varies between magnitudes 8.7 to 11.6 over 332 days. It is unusual in that it is a red star with a high proper motion (greater than 50 milliarcseconds a year). Located around 1072 light-years distant, it shines with a luminosity approximately 1839 times that of the Sun and has a surface temperature of 3340 K.

In 1907 it was announced that Henrietta Swan Leavitt had discovered the star, then called BD+36°2672, is a variable star. It was given its variable star designation, RS Coronae Borealis, in 1910.
