= RR Coronae Borealis =

M3-type semiregular variable star in the constellation Corona Borealis

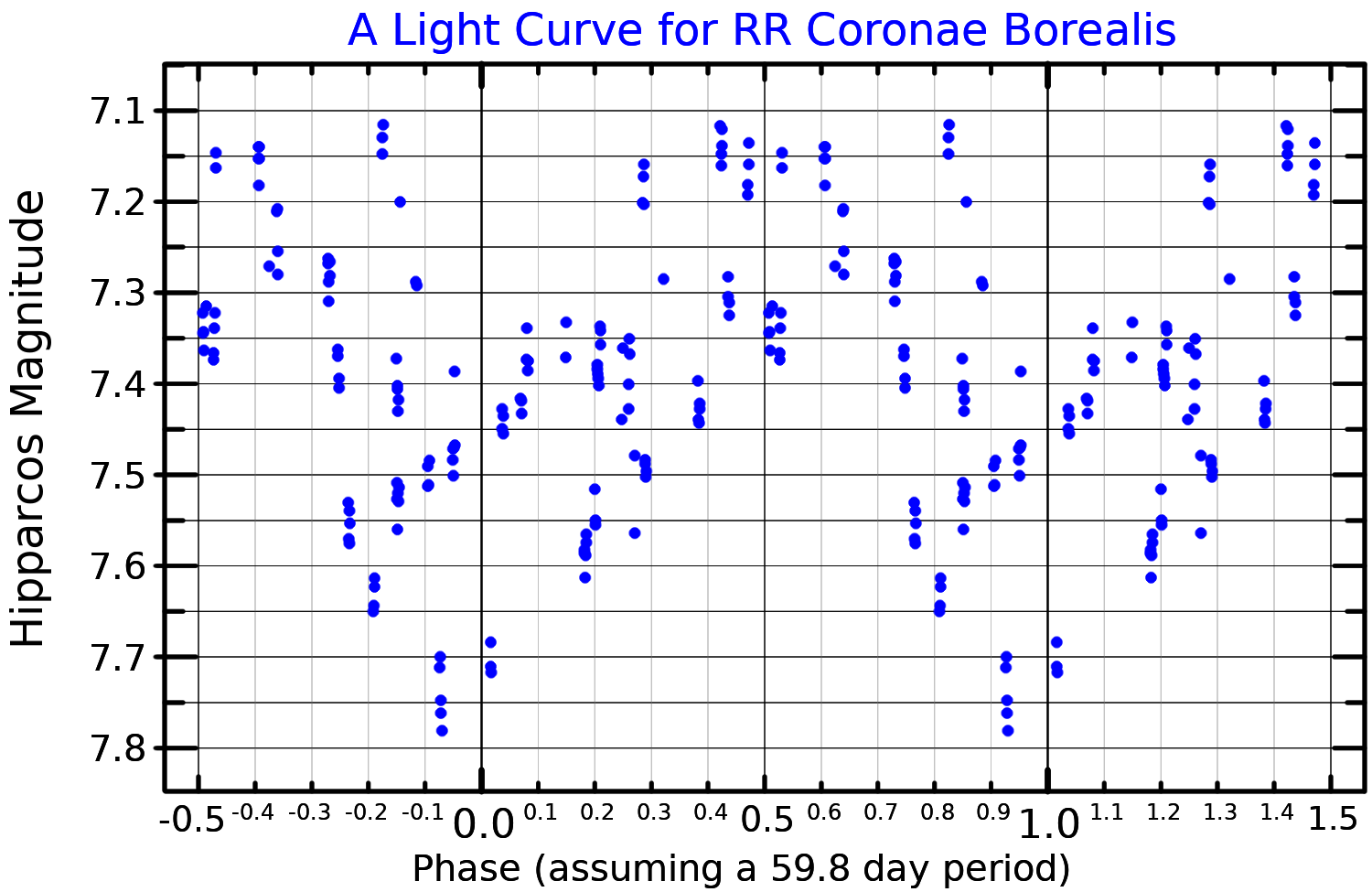
- A light curve for RR Coronae Borealis, plotted from Hipparcos data

Observation data Epoch J2000 Equinox ICRS
- Constellation: Corona Borealis
- Right ascension: 15^{h} 41^{m} 26.22899^{s}
- Declination: +38° 33′ 26.5958″
- Apparent magnitude (V): 7.3 - 8.2

Characteristics
- Evolutionary stage: AGB
- Spectral type: M5III (M3 - M6)
- Variable type: SRb

Astrometry
| Radial velocity (R_{v}) | -58.39 km/s |
| Proper motion (μ) | RA: 20.24 mas/yr Dec.: -32.44 mas/yr |
| Parallax (π) | 2.93±0.53 mas |
| Distance | approx. 1,100 ly (approx. 340 pc) |

Details
| Luminosity | 2,180 L_{☉} |
| Temperature | 3,309 K |

Other designations
- RR CrB, BD+39° 2901, HD 140297, HIP 76844, SAO 64848, GC 21108, TYC 3053-1035-1, 2MASS J15412622+3833266

Database references
| SIMBAD | data |

RR Coronae Borealis (RR CrB, HD 140297, HIP 76844) is a M3-type semiregular variable star located in the constellation Corona Borealis with a parallax of 2.93mas being a distance of 341 parsecs (1,110 ly). It varies between magnitudes 7.3 and 8.2 over 60.8 days. Located around 1228 light-years distant, it shines with a luminosity approximately 2180 times that of the Sun and has a surface temperature of 3309 K.

In 1907 it was announced that Williamina Fleming had discovered that the star, listed then as BD +39° 2901, is a variable star. She had determined that from the examination of 26 photographic plates taken from 1892 to 1907. It was given its variable star designation, RR Coronae Borealis, in 1908.
