= Zeta Coronae Borealis =

Binary star in the constellation Corona Borealis

ζ Coronae Borealis
- Location of ζ Coronae Borealis (circled)

Observation data Epoch J2000.0 Equinox ICRS
- Constellation: Corona Borealis
- ζ^{1}
- Right ascension: 15^{h} 39^{m} 22.244^{s}
- Declination: +36° 38′ 12.59″
- Apparent magnitude (V): 5.95
- ζ^{2}
- Right ascension: 15^{h} 39^{m} 22.672^{s}
- Declination: +36° 38′ 08.92″
- Apparent magnitude (V): 4.99

Characteristics

ζ^{1}
- Evolutionary stage: Main sequence
- Spectral type: B9 V

ζ^{2}
- Evolutionary stage: Main sequence
- Spectral type: B6 V + B7 V

Astrometry

ζ^{1}
| Radial velocity (R_{v}) | −18.43+0.50 −0.51 km/s |
| Proper motion (μ) | RA: −14.011 mas/yr Dec.: −3.919 mas/yr |
| Parallax (π) | 6.2190±0.0685 mas |
| Distance | 524 ± 6 ly (161 ± 2 pc) |

ζ^{2}
| Radial velocity (R_{v}) | −30.79±0.66 km/s |
| Proper motion (μ) | RA: −15.510 mas/yr Dec.: −7.465 mas/yr |
| Parallax (π) | 6.4259±0.0960 mas |
| Distance | 508 ± 8 ly (156 ± 2 pc) |

Orbit
| Primary | ζ^{1} A |
| Name | ζ^{1} B |
| Period (P) | 4.06±0.01 days |
| Semi-major axis (a) | ≥0.49±0.10 R_{☉} (A) |
| Eccentricity (e) | 0.16+0.14 −0.16 |
| Periastron epoch (T) | 2,460,429.46±0.14 JD |
| Argument of periastron (ω) (secondary) | 262+66 −51° |
| Semi-amplitude (K_{1}) (primary) | 6.1±0.8 km/s |

Orbit
| Primary | ζ^{2} A |
| Name | ζ^{2} B |
| Period (P) | 1.7236±0.0002 days |
| Semi-major axis (a) | ≥2.98±0.05 R_{☉} (A) ≥3.16±0.05 R_{☉} (B) |
| Eccentricity (e) | 0 |
| Inclination (i) | ~38° |
| Periastron epoch (T) | 2,460,428.92±0.01 JD |
| Semi-amplitude (K_{1}) (primary) | 87.19+1.10 −1.09 km/s |
| Semi-amplitude (K_{2}) (secondary) | 92.86±1.10 km/s |

Orbit
| Primary | ζ^{2} AB |
| Name | ζ^{2} C |
| Period (P) | 251.5±0.6 days |
| Semi-major axis (a) | ≥124±7 R_{☉} |
| Eccentricity (e) | 0.48±0.03 |
| Periastron epoch (T) | 2,449,373.5±1.7 JD |
| Argument of periastron (ω) (secondary) | 191.8±2.9° |
| Semi-amplitude (K_{1}) (primary) | 28.5±2.0 km/s |

Details

ζ^{1} A
| Mass | 3.24 M_{☉} |
| Radius | 2.63±0.06 R_{☉} |
| Luminosity | 194.5+3.7 −4.0 L_{☉} |
| Surface gravity (log g) | 4.043+0.014 −0.016 cgs |
| Temperature | 13,292+58 −72 K |
| Rotational velocity (v sin i) | 15 km/s |

ζ^{2} A
| Mass | 4.13 M_{☉} |
| Radius | 2.38 R_{☉} |
| Rotation | 1.7 days |
| Rotational velocity (v sin i) | 46±7 km/s |

ζ^{2} B
| Mass | 3.73 M_{☉} |
| Rotational velocity (v sin i) | 7.5±2 km/s |

ζ^{2} C
| Mass | 3.78 M_{☉} |

Other designations
- 7 Coronae Borealis, BD+37°2665, HIP 76669, CCDM J15394+3638, WDS J15394+3638
- ζ^{1}: ζ CrB B, HD 139891, HR 5833
- ζ^{2}: ζ CrB A, HD 139892, HR 5834

Database references
| SIMBAD | ζ |
- ζ^{1}
- ζ^{2}

ζ Coronae Borealis is a double star in the constellation Corona Borealis. Its name is a Bayer designation that is Latinised as Zeta Coronae Borealis, and abbreviated Zeta CrB or ζ Crb. The two components are separated by six arc-seconds and share the same Hipparcos catalogue number and Flamsteed designation. Each of the two is also a spectroscopic multiple system, with a total of five stars in the group.

== Nomenclature ==
ζ Coronae Borealis has the Flamsteed designation 7 Coronae Borealis and the Hipparcos catalogue number HIP 76669. As a double star, the brighter component is designated A (e.g. WDS J15394+3638 A) while the fainter of the two is designated B. The brighter star is also known as ζ^{2} Coronae Borealis and the fainter as ζ^{1} Coronae Borealis.

Each of the pair has its own Bright Star Catalogue and Henry Draper Catalogue numbers: HR 5833 and 5834, and HD 139891 and 139892 for ζ^{1} and ζ^{2} respectively.

== System ==
ζ^{1} Coronae Borealis is a single-lined spectroscopic binary, with an orbital period of about 9.5 days. The nature of the companion is unknown.

The brighter star, ζ^{2} Coronae Borealis, is a spectroscopic triple system, consisting of three massive stars. The inner pair orbit in 1.7 days, while the outer pair orbit in 251 days.
