= Iota Coronae Borealis =

Binary star system in the constellation Corona Borealis

- Location of ι Coronae Borealis (circled in red)

Observation data Epoch J2000.0 Equinox J2000.0 (ICRS)
- Constellation: Corona Borealis
- Right ascension: 16^{h} 01^{m} 26.56492^{s}
- Declination: +29° 51′ 03.8194″
- Apparent magnitude (V): 4.96

Characteristics
- Evolutionary stage: main sequence
- Spectral type: A0 IIIp(HgMnEu)s
- U−B color index: −0.15
- B−V color index: −0.06

Astrometry
Radial velocity (R_{v})	−20.8±0.4 km/s
Proper motion (μ)	RA: −38.817 mas/yr Dec.: −7.016 mas/yr
Parallax (π)	8.7701±0.0857 mas
Distance	372 ± 4 ly (114 ± 1 pc)
Absolute magnitude (M_{V})	+0.08

Orbit
Period (P)	35.474 d
Eccentricity (e)	0.56
Periastron epoch (T)	2441566.96 JD
Argument of periastron (ω) (secondary)	156°
Semi-amplitude (K_{1}) (primary)	2.3 km/s

Details

ι CrB A
Mass	3.16±0.04 M_{☉}
Radius	3.93^{+0.06}_{−0.07} R_{☉}
Luminosity	159±3 L_{☉}
Surface gravity (log g)	3.68±0.01 cgs
Temperature	7,601^{+11}_{−8} K
Metallicity [Fe/H]	−0.01±0.12 dex
Rotational velocity (v sin i)	18 km/s
Age	273±32 Myr

Other designations
- Aurwandilsta, ι CrB, 14 CrB, BD+30°2738, HD 143807, HIP 78493, HR 5971, SAO 84152

Database references
SIMBAD	data

Iota Coronae Borealis is a binary star system in the northern constellation of Corona Borealis. It has the proper name Aurwandilsta; Iota Coronae Borealis is its Bayer designation, which is Latinized from ι Coronae Borealis and abbreviated Iota CrB or ι CrB. This system is visible to the naked eye as a point of light with an apparent visual magnitude of 4.96. Based upon an annual parallax shift of 8.77 mas as seen from the Earth, it is located about 372 light years from the Sun.

This is a single-lined spectroscopic binary with an orbital period of 35.5 days and an eccentricity of 0.56. The visible member, component A, has a stellar classification of A0 IIIp(HgMnEu)s, indicating it is a chemically peculiar mercury-manganese star with narrow absorption lines. This star has an estimated age of approximately 273 million years and is spinning with a projected rotational velocity of 18 km/s. It has 3.3 times the mass and 3.9 times the radius of the Sun. The star is radiating 159 times the luminosity of the Sun from its photosphere at an effective temperature of 7,601 K. The secondary member, component B, appears to be an A-type star.

Aurwandils tá, "Aurvandill's Toe", is an old Norse constellation identified with Corona Borealis. The IAU Working Group on Star Names adopted the name Aurwandilsta for Iota Coronae Borealis A on 14 May 2026.
