= V Coronae Borealis =

Mira-type long period variable star in the constellation Corona Borealis

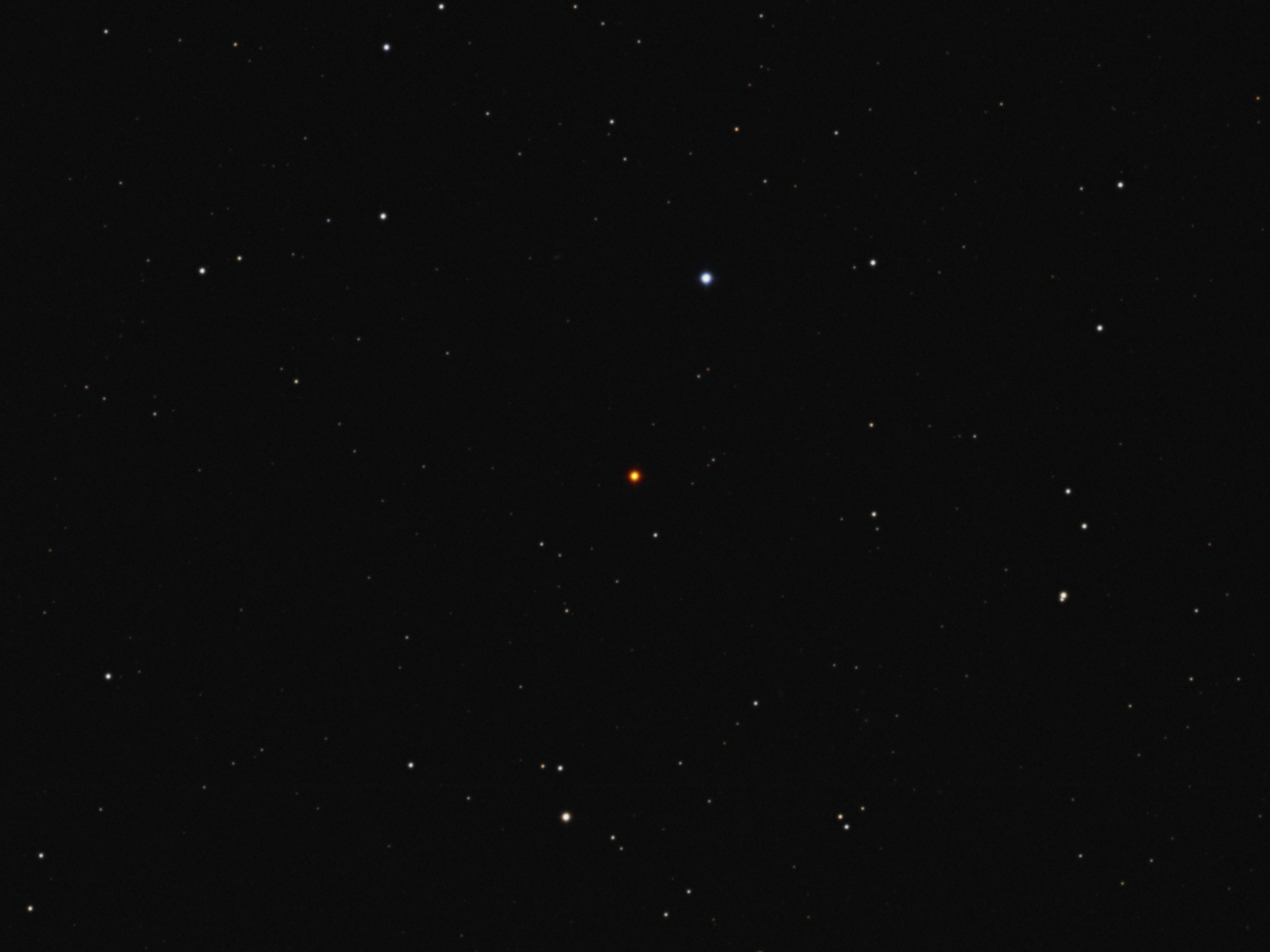
- V Coronae Borealis in optical light

Observation data Epoch J2000 Equinox ICRS
- Constellation: Corona Borealis
- Right ascension: 15^{h} 49^{m} 31.31220^{s}
- Declination: +39° 34′ 17.8926″
- Apparent magnitude (V): 6.9 - 12.6

Characteristics
- Evolutionary stage: AGB
- Spectral type: C6,2e(N2e)
- Variable type: Mira

Astrometry
Proper motion (μ)	RA: +5.905 mas/yr Dec.: −15.089 mas/yr
Parallax (π)	1.1378±0.0238 mas
Distance	2,870 ± 60 ly (880 ± 20 pc)

Details
Radius	750 (Note: Applying the Stefan–Boltzmann law with a nominal solar effective temperature of 5,772 K: $$\sqrt{(5,772/1,800)^4 \times 5,300} = 750\ R_\odot$$) R_{☉}
Luminosity	5,300 L_{☉}
Temperature	1,800 K

Other designations
- V CrB, BD+40 2929, HD 141826, HIP 77501, SAO 64929

Database references
SIMBAD	data

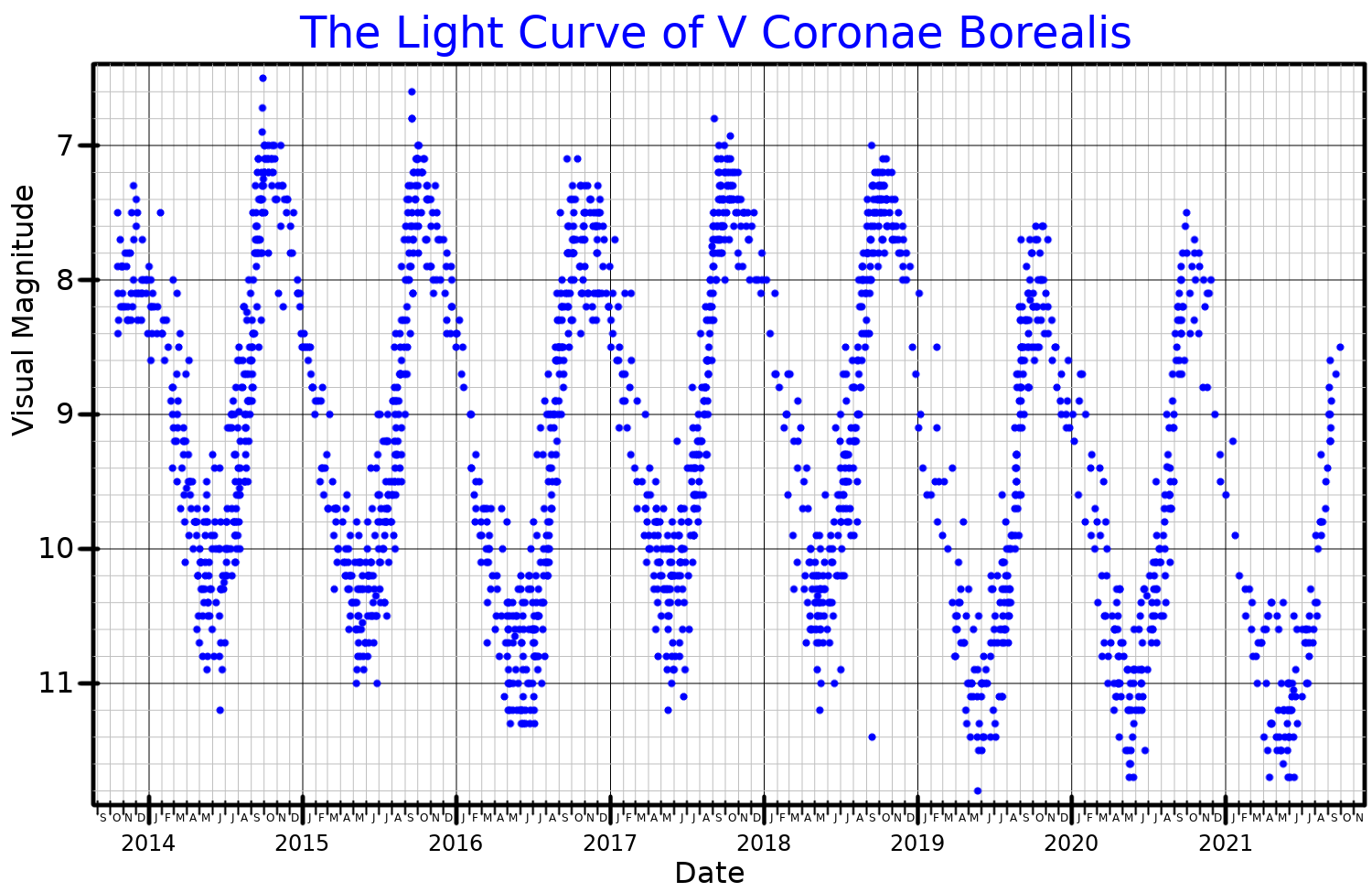
The visual band light curve of V Coronae Borealis, from AAVSO data

V Coronae Borealis (V CrB) is a Mira-type long period variable star and carbon star in the constellation Corona Borealis. Its apparent magnitude varies between 6.9 and 12.6 over a period of 357 days.

Based on a period of 357 days, the absolute magnitude of V Coronae Borealis has been calculated to be -4.62. It is estimated to be 880 pc (2,900 ly) from Earth based on parallax, has a luminosity of 5,300 L_{☉} and a rather cool effective temperature of 1,800 K, these implying a very large radius of about 750 R_{☉}, making V Coronae Borealis one of the largest stars so far discovered. If placed in the center of the Solar System, its size would engulf all rocky planets and reach parts of the asteroid belt.
