= Gamma Coronae Borealis =

Star in the constellation Corona Borealis

γ Coronae Borealis
- Location of γ Coronae Borealis (circled)

Observation data Epoch J2000 Equinox ICRS
- Constellation: Corona Borealis
- Right ascension: 15^{h} 42^{m} 44.56551^{s}
- Declination: +26° 17′ 44.2847″
- Apparent magnitude (V): 3.80 – 3.86 (4.04 + 5.60)

Characteristics
- Spectral type: B9 V + A3 V
- U−B color index: −0.03
- B−V color index: +0.00
- Variable type: δ Sct

Astrometry
| Radial velocity (R_{v}) | −15.26±4.54 km/s |
| Proper motion (μ) | RA: −111.65 mas/yr Dec.: +49.52 mas/yr |
| Parallax (π) | 22.33±0.50 mas |
| Distance | 146 ± 3 ly (45 ± 1 pc) |
| Absolute magnitude (M_{V}) | +0.56 |

Orbit
| Period (P) | 91.2±0.4 yr |
| Semi-major axis (a) | 0.729±0.006″ |
| Eccentricity (e) | 0.48±0.01 |
| Inclination (i) | 94.45±0.07° |
| Longitude of the node (Ω) | 111.75±0.09° |
| Periastron epoch (T) | 1931.6±0.3 |
| Argument of periastron (ω) (secondary) | 103.8±0.6° |

Details

γ CrB A
| Mass | 2.51±0.04 M_{☉} |
| Luminosity | 59 L_{☉} |
| Temperature | 7,649±22 K |
| Rotational velocity (v sin i) | 182±12 km/s |
| Age | 400 Myr |

Other designations
- Baltesha, γ CrB, 8 CrB, BD+26°2722, HD 140436, HIP 76952, HR 5849, SAO 83958, ADS 9757, WDS J15427+2618

Database references
| SIMBAD | data |

Gamma Coronae Borealis is a binary star system in the northern constellation of Corona Borealis. It has the proper name Baltesha; Gamma Coronae Borealis is its Bayer designation. This system is visible to the naked eye as a point of light with an apparent visual magnitude of 3.83. Based upon an annual parallax shift of 22.33 mas as seen from Earth, it is located about 146 light years from the Sun. The system is moving closer to the Sun with a radial velocity of about −15 km/s.

== Nomenclature ==
Gamma Coronae Borealis, Latinized from γ Coronae Borealis, is the star's Bayer designation. The IAU Working Group on Star Names adopted the name Baltesha for the primary star (Gamma Coronae Borealis A) on 14 May 2026; ^{(MUL.)}BAL.TEŠ_{2}.A (pronounced Baltesha), the Asterism of Dignity, was an ancient Sumerian constellation in Corona Borealis.

== Binary system ==
The components of this system have been optically separated, with the secondary lying about one arc second away from the primary. They have an orbital period of 91.2 years and an eccentricity of 0.48. The semimajor axis is 0.73 arc seconds − roughly the distance from the Sun to Neptune − and the inclination of the orbital plane is 94.5°. Both components are main sequence stars: the visual magnitude 4.04 primary has a stellar classification of B9 V, while the secondary is of class A3 V and magnitude 5.60.

== Variability ==
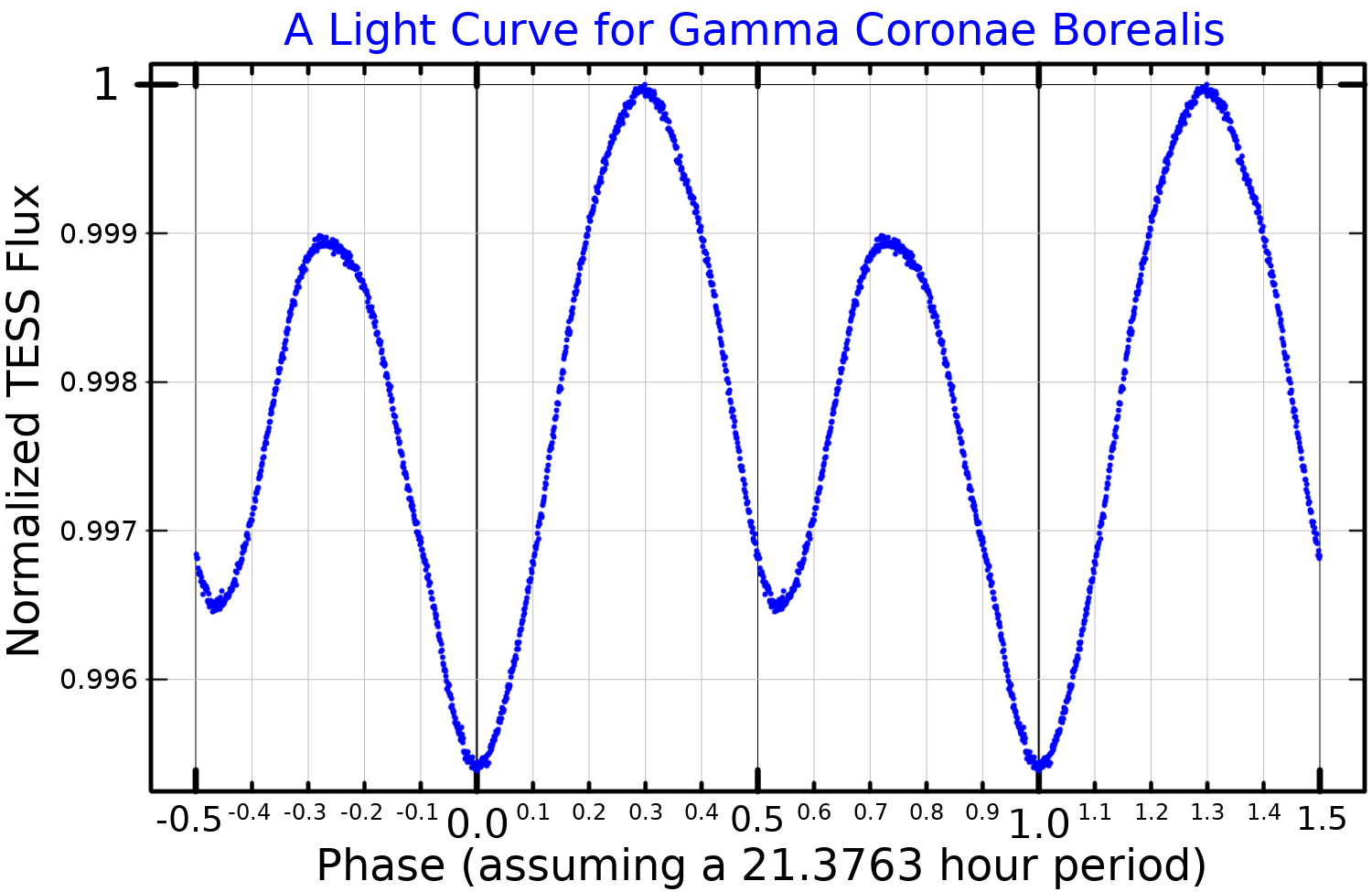
A light curve for Gamma Coronae Borealis, plotted from TESS data

In 1969, γ Coronae Borealis was confirmed to be variable with an amplitude of 0.05 magnitudes. A year later, it was "confirmed" to be a δ Scuti variable with the earliest known spectral type in the class. The observed variations were not strictly periodic, but showed a characteristic timescale of 0.03 days (43 minutes). γ Coronae Borealis also showed anomalous behaviour not seen in other δ Scuti stars, such as periods without variation.

When the pulsation mechanisms of the δ Scuti stars and the similar but hotter Slowly pulsating B-type (SPB) stars were identified, it became apparent that γ Coronae Borealis and a handful of similar low amplitude variable stars such as γ Ursae Minoris and Maia fell between those two classes in a region with no known driver for pulsations. The Maia variable class was named for these stars. Ironically, Maia itself has been shown not to be variable, and a number of other reported members of the class have been shown to be variables of other types, so the Maia variables appear to be very rare if they are even a real variable class. However, satellite observations have discovered a number of small-amplitude variables between the SPB and δ Scuti instability regions as well as a number of candidates in the open clusters NGC 3766 and NGC 1893.

The mechanism of variability for γ Coronae Borealis is not known. Spectroscopic variations with a period of 0.9 days have been observed, which matches the likely rotation period of the star, and radial velocity changes are also seen with a possible period of 0.45 days. Short-period non-radial pulsations may be carried around by the rotation of the star, but the driver of such pulsations in a star of this temperature is unknown.
