= Delta Coronae Borealis =

Yellow giant star in the constellation Corona Borealis

- Location of δ Coronae Borealis (circled)

Observation data Epoch J2000.0 Equinox J2000.0 (ICRS)
- Constellation: Corona Borealis
- Right ascension: 15^{h} 49^{m} 35.64700^{s}
- Declination: +26° 04′ 06.2143″
- Apparent magnitude (V): 4.57 to 4.69

Characteristics
- Evolutionary stage: red giant branch
- Spectral type: G5III-IV Fe-1
- U−B color index: +0.32
- B−V color index: +0.78
- Variable type: RS CVn?

Astrometry
Radial velocity (R_{v})	−20.356±0.035 km/s
Proper motion (μ)	RA: −78.907 mas/yr Dec.: −64.894 mas/yr
Parallax (π)	19.4965±0.0850 mas
Distance	167.3 ± 0.7 ly (51.3 ± 0.2 pc)
Absolute magnitude (M_{V})	+1.18

Details
Mass	2.4 M_{☉}
Radius	7.4 R_{☉}
Luminosity	34.3 L_{☉}
Surface gravity (log g)	3.29 cgs
Temperature	5,180 K
Metallicity [Fe/H]	−0.12 dex
Rotation	59 days
Rotational velocity (v sin i)	4.56 km/s
Age	851 Myr

Other designations
- Matrichakra, δ CrB, 10 CrB, BD+26°2737, HD 141714, HIP 77512, HR 5889, SAO 84019

Database references
SIMBAD	data

Delta Coronae Borealis is a variable star in the constellation of Corona Borealis. It has the proper name Matrichakra; Delta Coronae Borealis is its Bayer designation, which is Latinized from δ Coronae Borealis and abbreviated Delta CrB or δ CrB. This star is visible to the naked eye with an apparent visual magnitude that varies regularly between apparent magnitude 4.57 and 4.69. Based on parallax measurements it is around 167 light-years (51 pc) 167 light-years distant from the Earth. The star is drifting closer with a line of sight velocity component of −20 km/s.

In Indian astronomy, Corona Borealis is known as Mātṛcakra (मातृचक्र), the circle. The IAU Working Group on Star Names adopted the English phonetic spelling Matrichakra as a name for Delta Coronae Borealis on 14 May 2026.

== Observations ==
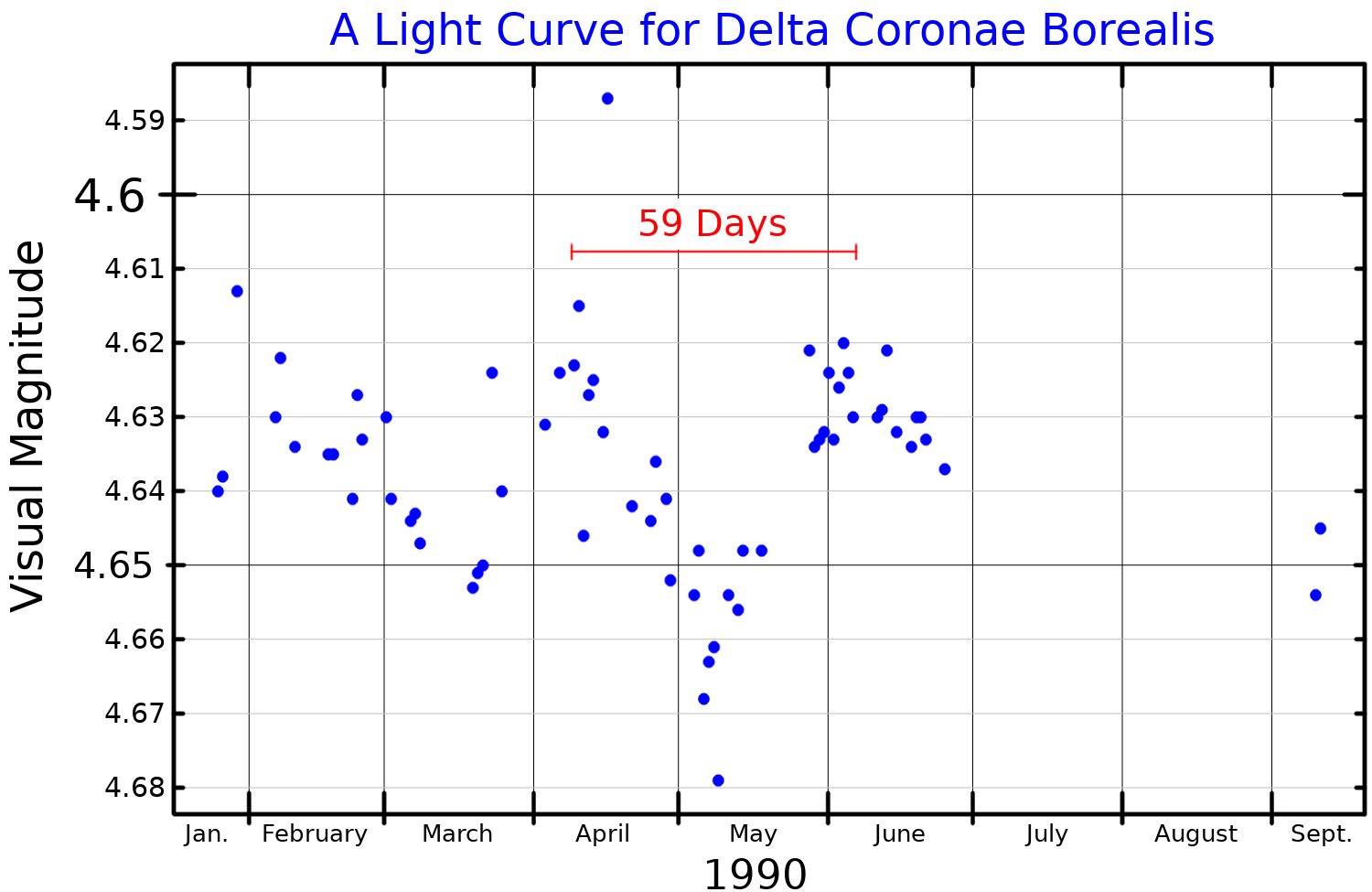
A visual bandlight curve for Delta Coronae Borealis, plotted from data published by Fernie (1991). The 59 day rotation period is shown in red.

δ Coronae Borealis is a yellow giant star of spectral type G3.5III that is around 2.4 times as massive as the Sun and has swollen to 7.4 times its radius. It has a surface temperature of 5180 K.

For most of its existence, Delta Coronae Borealis was a blue-white main sequence star of spectral type B before it ran out of hydrogen fuel in its core. Its luminosity and spectrum suggest it has just crossed the Hertzsprung gap, having finished burning core hydrogen and now begun burning hydrogen in its shell. However, one recent paper gives a 64% chance that it has begun fusing core helium and is on the horizontal branch. It is a strong source of X-rays due to its hot corona.

In 1989, it was noticed that the brightness of δ Coronae Borealis is not constant. Approximately every 45 days, its brightness changes sinusoidally between 4.57 and 4.69, too small to be noticed without close monitoring. The evolutionary state of the star and its probable rotation period mean that the variations may be due to its rotation with different parts of the surface having spots or different temperatures. This would make it an RS Canum Venaticorum variable. The period has since been refined to 59 days and this is now accepted as the star's rotation period.
