= TY Coronae Borealis =

Variable white dwarf in the constellation Corona Borealis

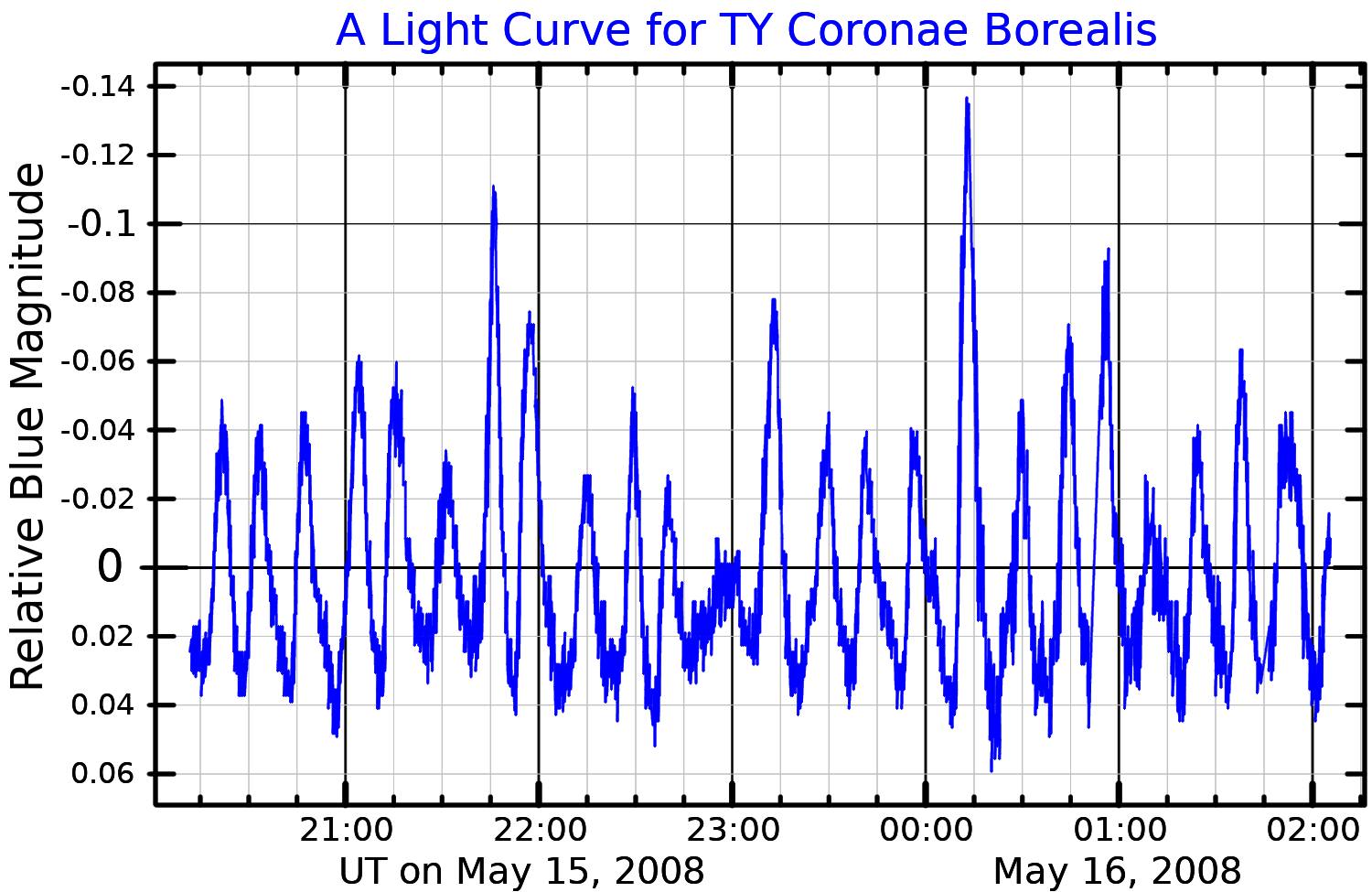
- A blue band light curve for TY Coronae Borealis, adapted from Bognár et al. (2019)

Observation data Epoch J2000.0 Equinox ICRS
- Constellation: Corona Borealis
- Right ascension: 16^{h} 01^{m} 23.187^{s}
- Declination: +36° 48′ 34.29″
- Apparent magnitude (V): 14.435±0.018

Characteristics
- Evolutionary stage: White dwarf
- Spectral type: DA4.4
- Variable type: ZZ Ceti

Astrometry
Proper motion (μ)	RA: 101.113 mas/yr Dec.: −545.353 mas/yr
Parallax (π)	30.4668±0.0187 mas
Distance	107.05 ± 0.07 ly (32.82 ± 0.02 pc)
Absolute magnitude (M_{V})	+11.81

Details
Mass	0.593±0.028 to 0.615+0.024 −0.025 M_{☉}
Radius	0.0131±0.0014 R_{☉}
Luminosity	(1.83±0.03)×10^{−3} L_{☉}
Surface gravity (log g)	8.194 cgs
Temperature	11,000 K
Age	447 (white dwarf stage) Myr

Other designations
- TY CrB, Ross 808, WD 1600+369, LTT 14769, NLTT 41782, 2MASS J16012317+3648351

Database references
SIMBAD	data

TY Coronae Borealis, also known as Ross 808, is a white dwarf in the constellation Corona Borealis. It is 107 light-years distant from Earth, and has a dim apparent magnitude of 14.4.

It is a pulsating white dwarf of the DAV (ZZ Ceti) type. The variation in the blue band is of 0.14 magnitudes, over a period of 15 minutes. It was confirmed as a variable star in 1976, and now has the variable-star designation TY Coronae Borealis. Being of this variable class, it has been a target for asteroseismic analyses, in attempt to derive its physical properties such as mass, radius and gravity. However, it seems estimations of the stellar mass derived for this star using asteroseismology had been overestimated.

TY Coronae Borealis has around 0.6 times the mass of the Sun and a tiny diameter of only 1.3% that of the Sun. It is a dim star, with 0.2% of the Sun's luminosity. It has an effective temperature of about 11,000 K, have taken 450 million years to cool to its temperature. This is also its age as a white dwarf.
