= ADS 9731 =

Star system with 6 stars in the constellation Corona Borealis

Observation data Epoch J2000 Equinox J2000
- Constellation: Corona Borealis
- Right ascension: 15^{h} 38^{m} 12.91478^{s}
- Declination: +36° 14′ 48.5597″
- Apparent magnitude (V): 6.9 (total)

Characteristics
- Spectral type: F4V + F5V + G4V + F3V + F7V + M3V?

Astrometry

A
Proper motion (μ)	RA: +73.197 mas/yr Dec.: −57.740 mas/yr
Parallax (π)	9.0945±0.0175 mas
Distance	358.6 ± 0.7 ly (110.0 ± 0.2 pc)
Absolute magnitude (M_{V})	+2.462

B
Proper motion (μ)	RA: +71.824 mas/yr Dec.: −54.140 mas/yr
Parallax (π)	9.1101±0.0307 mas
Distance	358 ± 1 ly (109.8 ± 0.4 pc)
Absolute magnitude (M_{V})	+4.94

C
Proper motion (μ)	RA: +75.165 mas/yr Dec.: −59.731 mas/yr
Parallax (π)	9.0970±0.0199 mas
Distance	358.5 ± 0.8 ly (109.9 ± 0.2 pc)
Absolute magnitude (M_{V})	+2.72

D
Proper motion (μ)	RA: +72.818 mas/yr Dec.: −58.281 mas/yr
Parallax (π)	9.0870±0.0322 mas
Distance	359 ± 1 ly (110.0 ± 0.4 pc)
Absolute magnitude (M_{V})	+3.82

Orbit
Primary	A
Name	B
Period (P)	834 yr
Semi-major axis (a)	1.249″
Inclination (i)	97.0°

Orbit
Primary	C
Name	D
Period (P)	1,230 yr
Semi-major axis (a)	1.582″
Inclination (i)	78.4°

Orbit
Primary	Aa
Name	Ab
Period (P)	3.2732 days
Eccentricity (e)	0.011
Semi-amplitude (K_{1}) (primary)	85.67 km/s
Semi-amplitude (K_{2}) (secondary)	87.28 km/s

Orbit
Primary	Da
Name	Db
Period (P)	14.284 days
Eccentricity (e)	0.31
Semi-amplitude (K_{1}) (primary)	9.92 km/s

Details

Aa
Mass	1.51±0.07 M_{☉}
Radius	2.22+0.99 −0.23 R_{☉}
Luminosity	7.46+0.90 −0.30 L_{☉}
Surface gravity (log g)	3.89+0.77 −0.63 cgs
Temperature	6,405+678 −230 K
Metallicity [Fe/H]	−1.07+0.71 −0.36 dex
Age	2.21+0.81 −0.41 Gyr

Ab
Mass	1.32 M_{☉}

C
Mass	1.451+0.017 −0.016 M_{☉}
Radius	1.93+0.86 −0.31 R_{☉}
Luminosity	6.10+0.90 −0.80 L_{☉}
Surface gravity (log g)	3.85+0.86 −0.32 cgs
Temperature	6,600+800 −600 K
Metallicity [Fe/H]	−1.18+0.98 −0.03 dex
Age	2.15±0.68 Gyr

Da
Mass	1.26 M_{☉}

Db
Mass	0.13 M_{☉}

Other designations
- BD+36°2626, HD 139691, CCDM J15382+3615AB, WDS J15382+3615AB

Database references
SIMBAD	data

ADS 9731 is a star system that consists of six stars, located in the constellation of Corona Borealis. Four of the stars are visually separate in the sky, forming a visual star system, which was resolved using adaptive optics in 1995. Two of these stars were themselves found to be spectroscopic binaries in 1998, resulting in a total of six known stars in the system. It is one of very few multiple star systems known to have at least six members.

== Characteristics ==
Aa
Period = 3.27 d
Ab
Period = 834 y
B
Period > 20,000 y
C
Period = 1,230 y
Da
Period = 14.28 d
Db

Hierarchy of orbits

The components are organised thus: Aa and Ab are yellow-white main sequence stars of spectral types F4V and F5V and 1.35 and 1.32 solar masses respectively, which orbit each other every 3.27 days. This pair is in a 834-year orbit with star B, a star of spectral type G4V that has about 66% of the mass of the Sun. Star C is a yellow white star of spectral type F3V around 1.41 times as massive as the sun, which has just started brightening and moving off the main sequence. It is in a 1,230-year orbit with a pair of stars, Da and Db, a yellow-white main sequence star of spectral type F7V and a red dwarf of spectral type M3V respectively. Da and Db take 14.28-days to orbit each other. Finally the system of stars C and Dab, and the system of stars Aab and B, take over 20,000 years to orbit each other.

The combined light from the whole system results in an integrated V magnitude of 6.9. Published apparent magnitudes for the components vary greatly and some are certainly in error, but components A, B, C, and D are approximately of visual magnitude 7.8, 10.2, 8.0, and 9.1 respectively. Models of all six components show that Aa and Ab have magnitudes 8.5 and 8.7 respectively while the faint secondary to component D is about 16th magnitude. The CD pair is slightly brighter than the AB pair, although component A is slightly brighter than component C.

Gaia EDR3 catalogues parallaxes for the four resolved stars, all at a distance of 360 light-years (110 pc) with a statistical margin of error of less than a parsec.

The star system has been considered as a possible target for direct imaging searches for exoplanets, but no planets have yet been detected in the system.
