= Abell 2142 =

Galaxy cluster in the constellation Corona Borealis

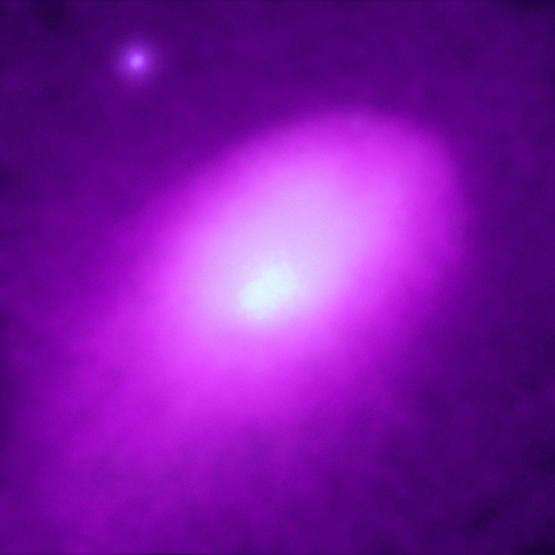
- Chandra X-ray Observatory image of Abell 2142.

Observation data (Epoch J2000)
- Constellation: Corona Borealis
- Right ascension: 15^{h} 58^{m} 19.8^{s}
- Declination: +27° 13′ 45.0″
- Number of galaxies: > 100
- Richness class: 2
- Bautz–Morgan classification: II
- Redshift: 0.09090 (27 251 km/s)
- Distance: 381 Mpc (1.243 billion light years.)
- ICM temperature: Central region (white): 50 million degrees Celsius. Outer region (magenta): 70 million degrees Celsius. Around the Cluster (darkish blue/faint magenta): 100 million degrees Celsius.
- Binding mass: ~6.3×10^{17} M_{☉}
- X-ray flux: (6.50 ± 0.70)×10^{−11} erg s^{−1} cm^{−2} (2-10 keV)

Abell 2142, or A2142, is an X-ray luminous galaxy cluster in the constellation Corona Borealis. It is the result of an ongoing merger between two galaxy clusters. The combined cluster is six million light years across, contains hundreds of galaxies and enough gas to make a thousand more. It is one of the most massive objects in the universe.

Abell 2142 is part of the Abell catalogue of rich clusters of galaxies published by astronomer George O. Abell in 1958. It has a heliocentric redshift of 0.0909 (meaning it is moving away from Earth at 27,250 km/s) and a visual magnitude of 16.0. It is about 1.2 billion light years (380 Mpc) away.

== X-Ray image ==
An image in X-rays (right) was taken on 20 August 1999 with the Chandra X-ray Observatory's Advanced CCD Imaging Spectrometer (ACIS), and covers an area of 7.5 x 7.2 arc minutes. It shows a bright but relatively cool 50 million degree Celsius central region (white) embedded in large elongated cloud of 70 million degree Celsius gas (magenta), all of which is embedded in a faint outer halo of 100 million degree Celsius gas (faint magenta and dark blue). The bright source in the upper left is an active galaxy in the cluster.

== Merger dynamics ==
A2142 has attracted attention because of its potential to shed light on the dynamics of mergers between galaxies. Clusters of galaxies grow through gravitational attraction of smaller groups and clusters. During a merger the kinetic energy of colliding objects heats the gas between subclusters, causing marked variations in gas temperature. These variations contain information on the stage, geometry and velocity of the merger. An accurate temperature map can provide a great deal of information on the nature of the underlying physical processes. Previous instruments (e.g., ROSAT, ASCA) did not have the capabilities of Chandra and XMM-Newton (two current X-ray observatories) and were unable to map the region in detail.

Chandra has been able to measure variations of temperature, density, and pressure with high resolution. "Now we can begin to understand the physics of these mergers, which are among the most energetic events in the universe," said Maxim Markevitch of the Harvard-Smithsonian Center for Astrophysics, Cambridge, Massachusetts, and leader of the international team involved in the analysis of the observations. "The pressure and density maps of the cluster show a sharp boundary that can only exist in the moving environment of a merger."

A2142's observed X-ray emissions are largely smooth and symmetric, suggesting it is a result of a merger between two galaxy clusters viewed at least 1–2 billion years after the initial core crossing. One would expect to observe uneven X-ray emission and obvious shock fronts if the merger was at an early stage. Markevitch et al. have proposed that the central galaxy (designated G1) of a more massive cluster has merged with the former central galaxy (G2) of the less massive cluster. The relatively cool central area suggests that the heating caused by previous shock fronts missed the central core, interacting instead with the surrounding gas.

== See also ==
- List of Abell clusters
- X-ray astronomy
