= UW Coronae Borealis =

Low-mass X-ray binary star in the constellation Corona Borealis

Observation data Epoch J2000.0 Equinox ICRS
- Constellation: Corona Borealis
- Right ascension: 16^{h} 05^{m} 45.87^{s}
- Declination: +36° 48′ 35.2″
- Apparent magnitude (V): 19.7

Other designations
- 1E 1603.6+2600, 2E 1603.6+2600, 1RXS J160545.3+255131, SDSS J160545.87+255145.1

Database references
SIMBAD	data

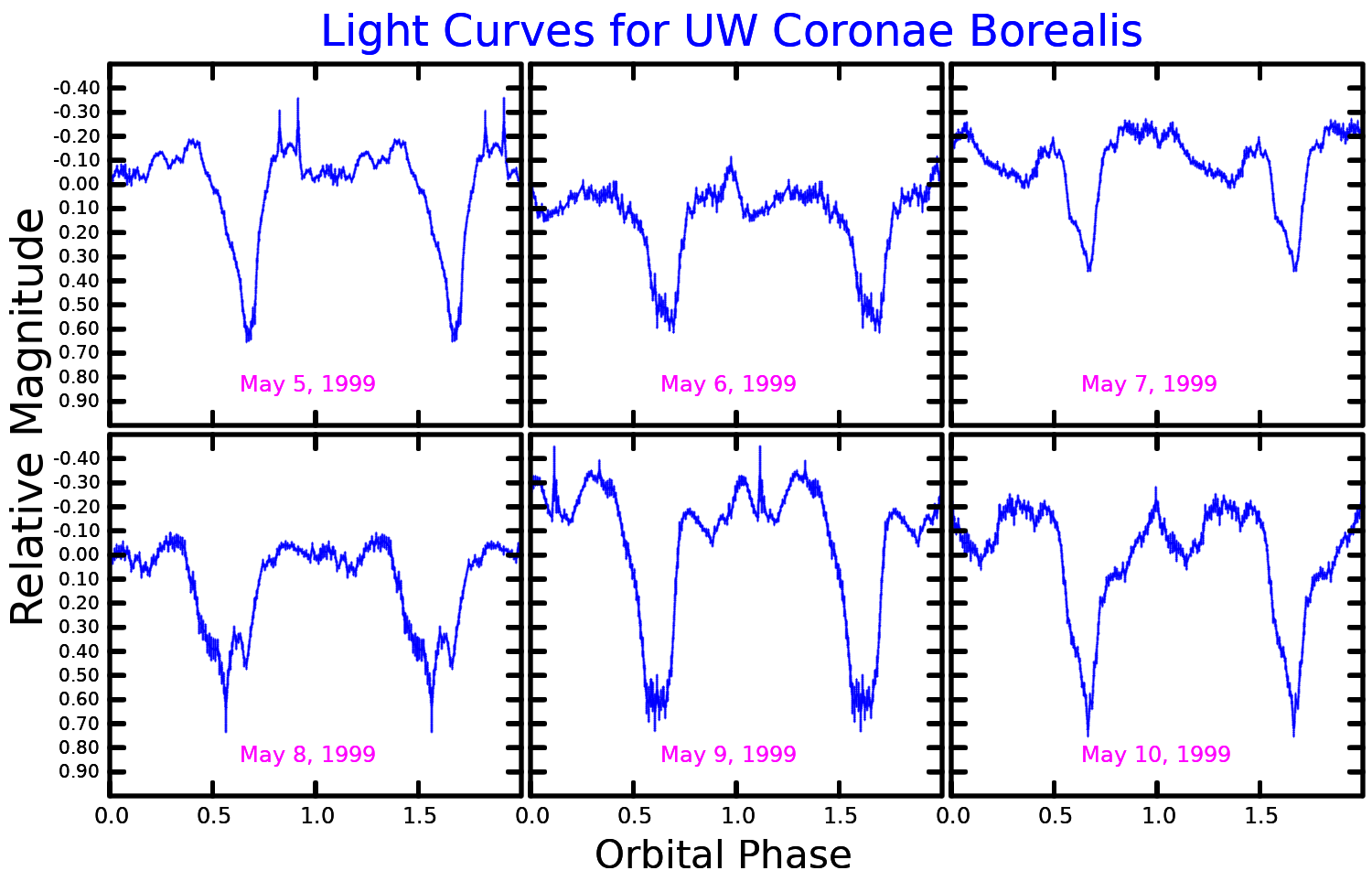
Six representative white-light light curves for UW Coronae Borealis, adapted from Hakala et al. (2009)

UW Coronae Borealis, also known as MS 1603.6+2600, is a low-mass X-ray binary star system in the constellation Corona Borealis. Astronomer Simon Morris and colleagues discovered the X-ray source in 1990 and were able to match it up with a faint star with an average visual magnitude of 19.4. The system is thought to be made up of a neutron star that has an accretion disk that draws material from its companion, a star less massive than the Sun. The disk is asymmetrical. The variability of the system is complex, with several periods identified: the two components orbit each other every 111 minutes, while there is another period of 112.6 minutes. The beat period of these is 5.5 days, which is thought to represent the precession of the asymmetrical accretion disk around the neutron star.
