= W Coronae Borealis =

Star in the constellation Corona Borealis

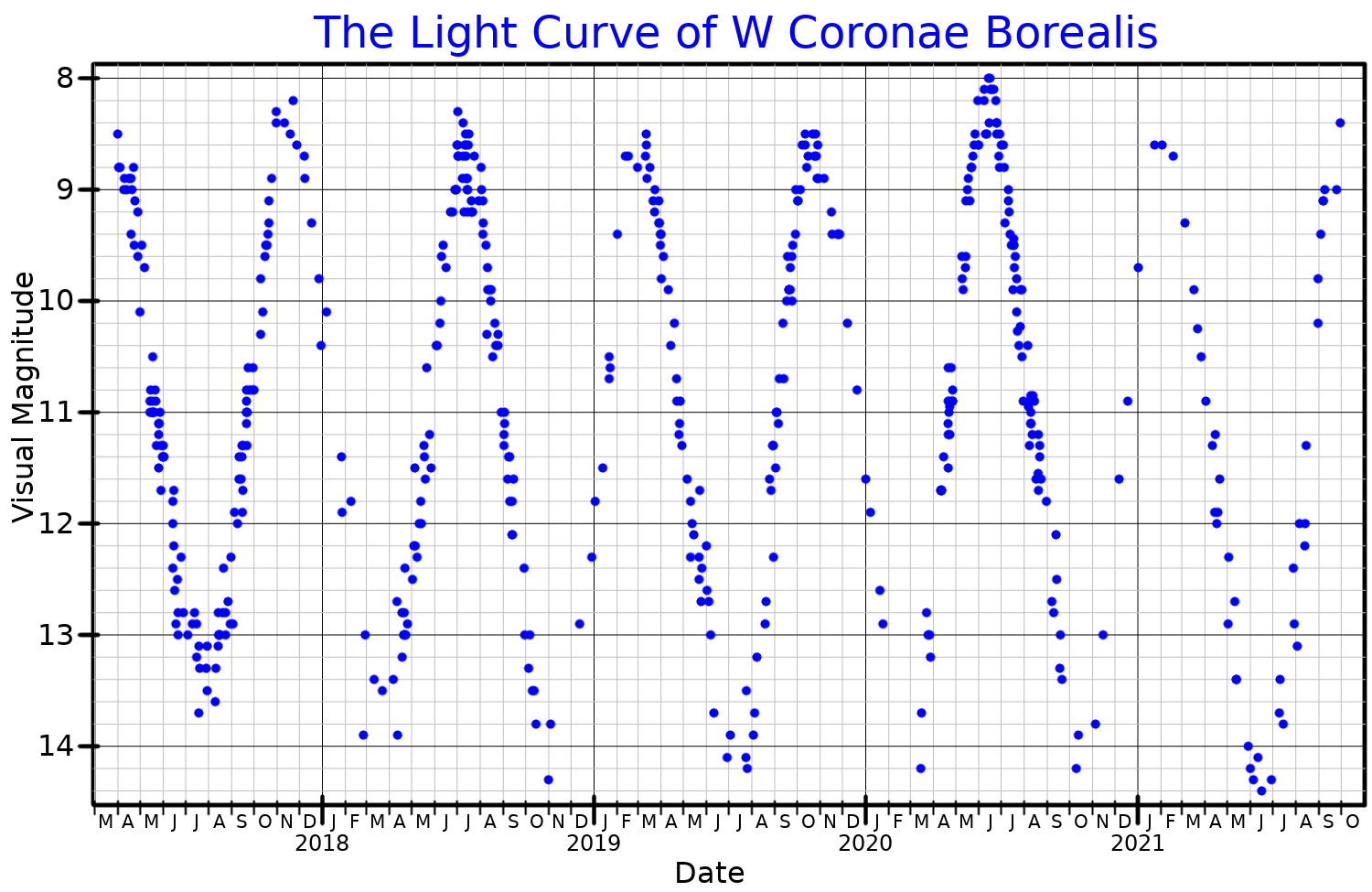
- The visual band light curve of W Coronae Borealis, from AAVSO data

Observation data Epoch J2000 Equinox ICRS
- Constellation: Corona Borealis
- Right ascension: 16^{h} 15^{m} 24.549^{s}
- Declination: +37° 47′ 44.21″
- Apparent magnitude (V): 7.8 - 14.3

Characteristics
- Evolutionary stage: AGB
- Spectral type: M2e-M5e
- Variable type: mira

Astrometry
Proper motion (μ)	RA: −9.527 mas/yr Dec.: −6.275 mas/yr
Parallax (π)	0.4201±0.0447 mas
Distance	approx. 7,800 ly (approx. 2,400 pc)

Details
Mass	3.9 M_{☉}
Radius	404 R_{☉}
Luminosity	6,088 L_{☉}
Surface gravity (log g)	1.38 cgs
Temperature	3,981 K

Other designations
- HD 146560

Database references
SIMBAD	data

W Coronae Borealis (W CrB) is a Mira-type long period variable star in the constellation Corona Borealis located about 7,800 light-years away. Its apparent magnitude varies between 7.8 and 14.3 over 238 days (8 months), representing about a 400–fold change in brightness. W Coronae Borealis enters solar conjunction and becomes hidden by the Sun's glare in late November. It reaches opposition in late April, when it is visible all night.
