= U Coronae Borealis =

Algol-type eclipsing binary star in the constellation Corona Borealis

Observation data Epoch J2000.0 Equinox ICRS
- Constellation: Corona Borealis
- Right ascension: 15^{h} 18^{m} 11.35252^{s}
- Declination: +31° 38′ 49.4159″
Spectral type	B6 V + F8 III-IV

Other designations
- BD+32°2569, HD 136175, HIP 74881, SAO 64619

Database references
SIMBAD	data

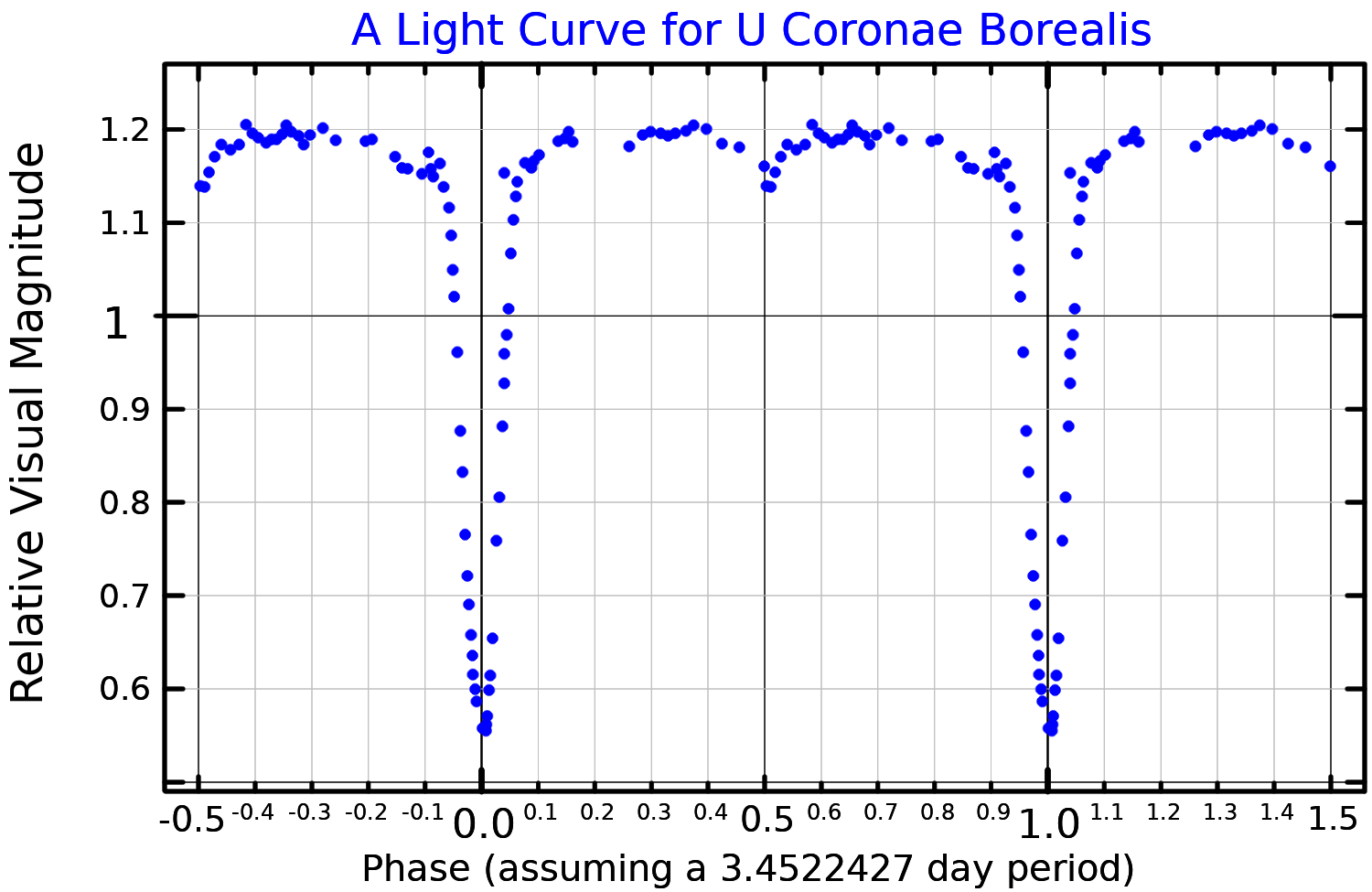
A visual band light curve for U Coronae Borealis, adapted from et al. (2003)

U Coronae Borealis (U CrB) is an Algol-type eclipsing binary star system in the constellation Corona Borealis. Its apparent magnitude varies between 7.66 and 8.79 over a period of 3.45 days. The component stars are a blue-white main sequence star of spectral type B6V and a cooler yellow-white subgiant star of spectral type F8III-IV.
