= Nu2 Coronae Borealis =

Red giant star in the constellation Corona Borealis

ν^{2} Coronae Borealis
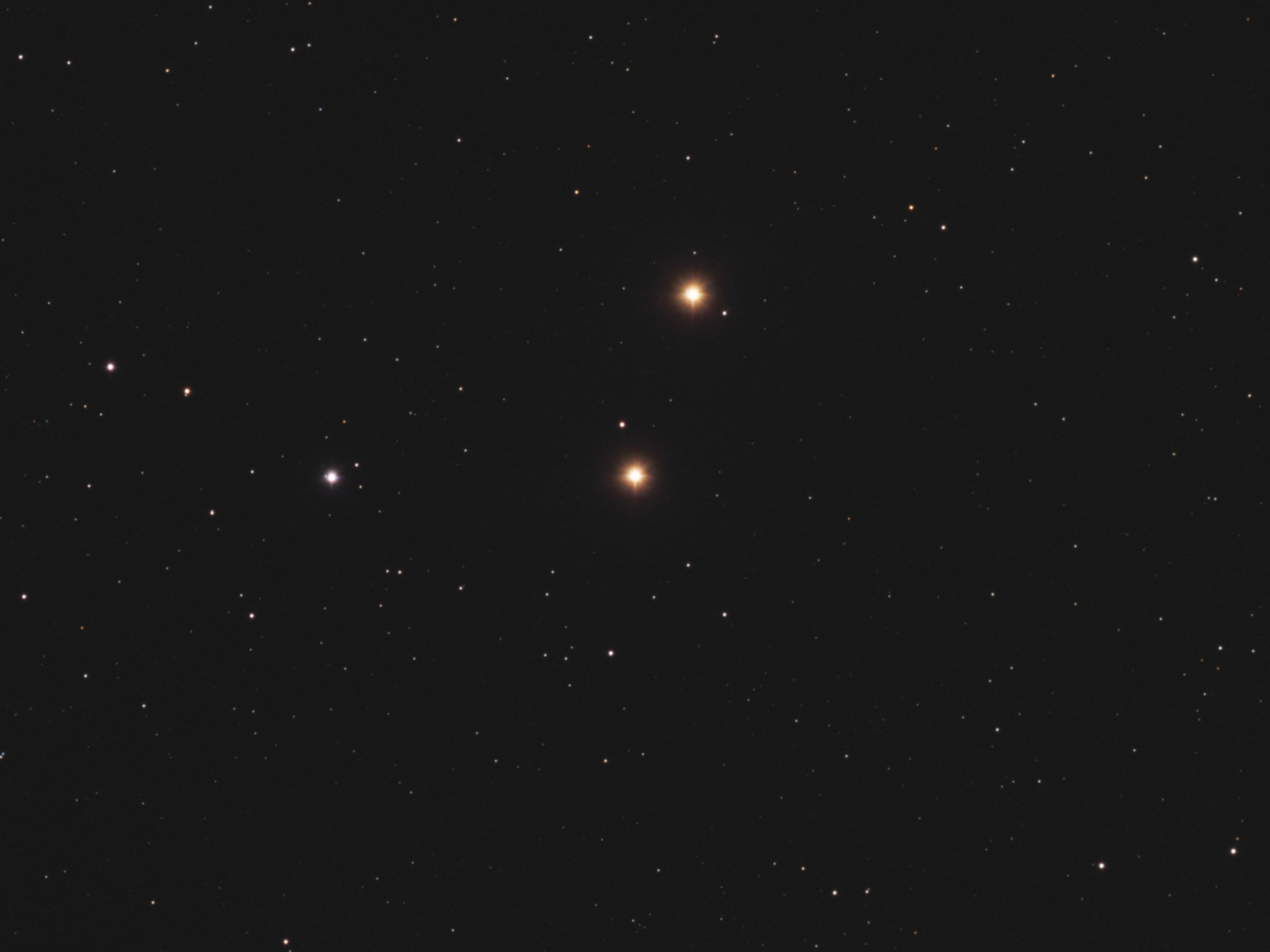
- ν^{2} Coronae Borealis (lower red star) in optical light

Observation data Epoch J2000.0 Equinox J2000.0 (ICRS)
- Constellation: Corona Borealis
- Right ascension: 16^{h} 22^{m} 29.21832^{s}
- Declination: +33° 42′ 12.5247″
- Apparent magnitude (V): +5.396

Characteristics
- Evolutionary stage: RGB
- Spectral type: K5 III
- U−B color index: +1.787
- B−V color index: +1.525

Astrometry
Radial velocity (R_{v})	−41.1±0.2 km/s
Proper motion (μ)	RA: −5.537 mas/yr Dec.: +49.931 mas/yr
Parallax (π)	5.7163±0.0624 mas
Distance	571 ± 6 ly (175 ± 2 pc)
Absolute magnitude (M_{V})	−0.78

Details
Mass	1.1 M_{☉}
Radius	64 R_{☉}
Luminosity	880 L_{☉}
Surface gravity (log g)	1.76 cgs
Temperature	3,940 K
Metallicity [Fe/H]	−0.16 dex
Rotational velocity (v sin i)	3.1 km/s

Other designations
- ν^{2} Coronae Borealis, 21 CrB, BD+34 2774, HD 147767, HIP 80214, HR 6108, SAO 65259

Database references
SIMBAD	data

Nu^{2} Coronae Borealis is a solitary, orange-hued star located in the northern constellation of Corona Borealis. It is faintly visible to the naked eye, having an apparent visual magnitude of +5.4. Based upon an annual parallax shift of 5.72 mas, it is located roughly 571 light years from the Sun. At that distance, the visual magnitude is diminished by an extinction of 0.1 due to interstellar dust.

This is an evolved red giant star with a stellar classification of K5 III. Nu^{2} Coronae Borealis is 64 times bigger than the Sun, radiating 880 times the Sun's luminosity from its photosphere at an effective temperature of 3,940 K.

The star ν^{1} Coronae Borealis lies 6′ north of ν^{2}. ν^{1} is also a red giant with almost the same apparent magnitude, but is a more luminous asymptotic giant branch star.
