= Nu1 Coronae Borealis =

Star in the constellation Corona Borealis

ν^{1} Coronae Borealis
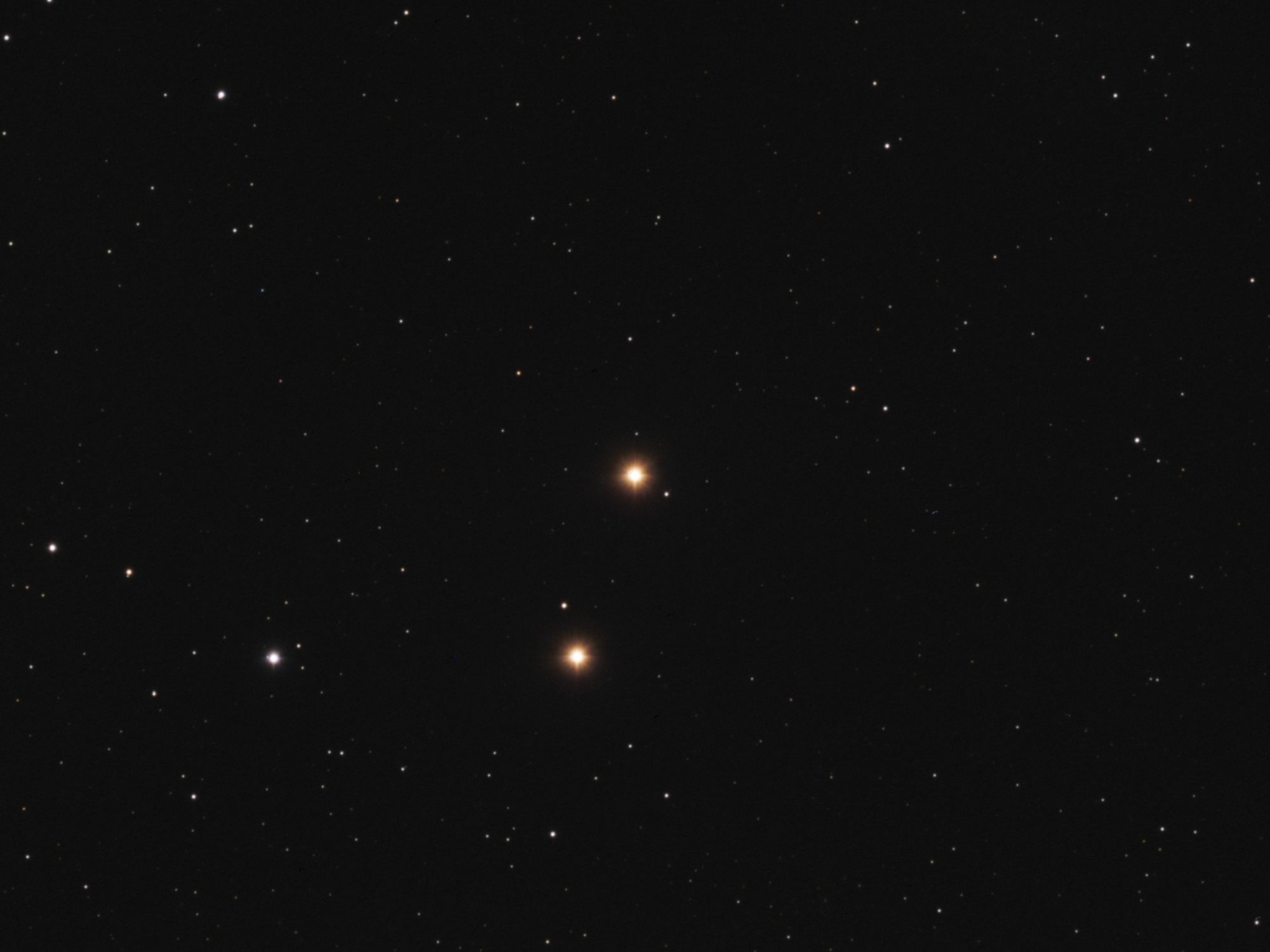
- ν^{1} Coronae Borealis (upper red star) in optical light

Observation data Epoch J2000.0 Equinox J2000.0 (ICRS)
- Constellation: Corona Borealis
- Right ascension: 16^{h} 22^{m} 21.42283^{s}
- Declination: +33° 47′ 56.5880″
- Apparent magnitude (V): 5.20

Characteristics
- Evolutionary stage: AGB
- Spectral type: M2 III
- B−V color index: 1.64

Astrometry
Radial velocity (R_{v})	−13.01±0.12 km/s
Proper motion (μ)	RA: +4.756 mas/yr Dec.: −38.223 mas/yr
Parallax (π)	5.0245±0.0843 mas
Distance	650 ± 10 ly (199 ± 3 pc)
Absolute magnitude (M_{V})	−1.19

Details
Mass	1.2 M_{☉}
Radius	80.78±2.88 R_{☉}
Luminosity	1,257±70 L_{☉}
Surface gravity (log g)	1.86 cgs
Temperature	3,828 K
Metallicity [Fe/H]	−0.21 dex

Other designations
- ν^{1} Coronae Borealis, 20 CrB, BD+34 2773, HD 147749, HIP 80197, HR 6107, SAO 65257

Database references
SIMBAD	data

Nu^{1} Coronae Borealis is a solitary, red-hued star located in the northern constellation of Corona Borealis. It is faintly visible to the naked eye, having an apparent visual magnitude of 5.20. Based upon an annual parallax shift of 5.02 mas, it is located roughly 650 light years from the Sun. At its distance, the visual magnitude is diminished by an extinction of 0.1 due to interstellar dust. This object is drifting closer with a radial velocity of −13 km/s.

This is an evolved red giant star with a stellar classification of M2 III. It is a variable star of uncertain type, showing a change in brightness with an amplitude of 0.0114 magnitude and a frequency of 0.22675 cycles per day, or 4.41 days/cycle. It has about 81 times the Sun's radius and is radiating nearly 1,300 times the Sun's luminosity from its photosphere at an effective temperature of 3,828 K.

The star ν^{2} Coronae Borealis lies 6′ south of ν^{1}. ν^{2} is also a red giant with almost the same apparent magnitude, but is a less luminous red giant branch star.
