= Theta Coronae Borealis =

Variable star in the constellation Corona Borealis

- Location of θ Coronae Borealis (circled in red)

Observation data Epoch J2000.0 Equinox J2000.0 (ICRS)
- Constellation: Corona Borealis
- Right ascension: 15^{h} 32^{m} 55.78214^{s}
- Declination: +31° 21′ 32.8762″
- Apparent magnitude (V): A: 4.06 - 4.33; B: 6.29

Characteristics
- Spectral type: B6Vnne + A2?
- B−V color index: −0.127±0.015
- Variable type: Be

Astrometry
Radial velocity (R_{v})	−25.7±0.3 km/s
Proper motion (μ)	RA: −20.15 mas/yr Dec.: −9.39 mas/yr
Parallax (π)	8.69±0.46 mas
Distance	380 ± 20 ly (115 ± 6 pc)
Absolute magnitude (M_{V})	−1.16

Details

A
Mass	4.2 M_{☉}
Radius	3.3 R_{☉}
Luminosity	538 L_{☉}
Temperature	14,000 K
Rotation	< 10 h
Rotational velocity (v sin i)	385 km/s
Age	85 Myr

B
Mass	2.5 M_{☉}

Other designations
- Guansuo, θ CrB, 4 CrB, BD+31°2750, FK5 576, HD 138749, HIP 76127, HR 5778, SAO 64769

Database references
SIMBAD	data
- A
- B

Theta Coronae Borealis is a binary star system in the northern constellation of Corona Borealis. It has the proper name Guansuo; Theta Coronae Borealis is its Bayer designation, which is Latinized from θ Coronae Borealis and abbreviated Theta CrB or θ CrB. This system shines with a combined apparent visual magnitude (V band) of around 4.14. It is located around 375 light-years from Earth, as estimated from its parallax of 8.69 mas.

== Observations ==
There are two components: Theta Coronae Borealis A with an apparent magnitude of about 4.2, while Theta Coronae Borealis B lies around 1 arcsecond distant and has an apparent magnitude of 6.29. The pair are estimated to be 85 million years old, with the primary star expected to remain on the main sequence burning its core hydrogen for another 75 million years and the secondary around 500 million years. Both stars will cool and expand once their core hydrogen is exhausted, becoming red giants.

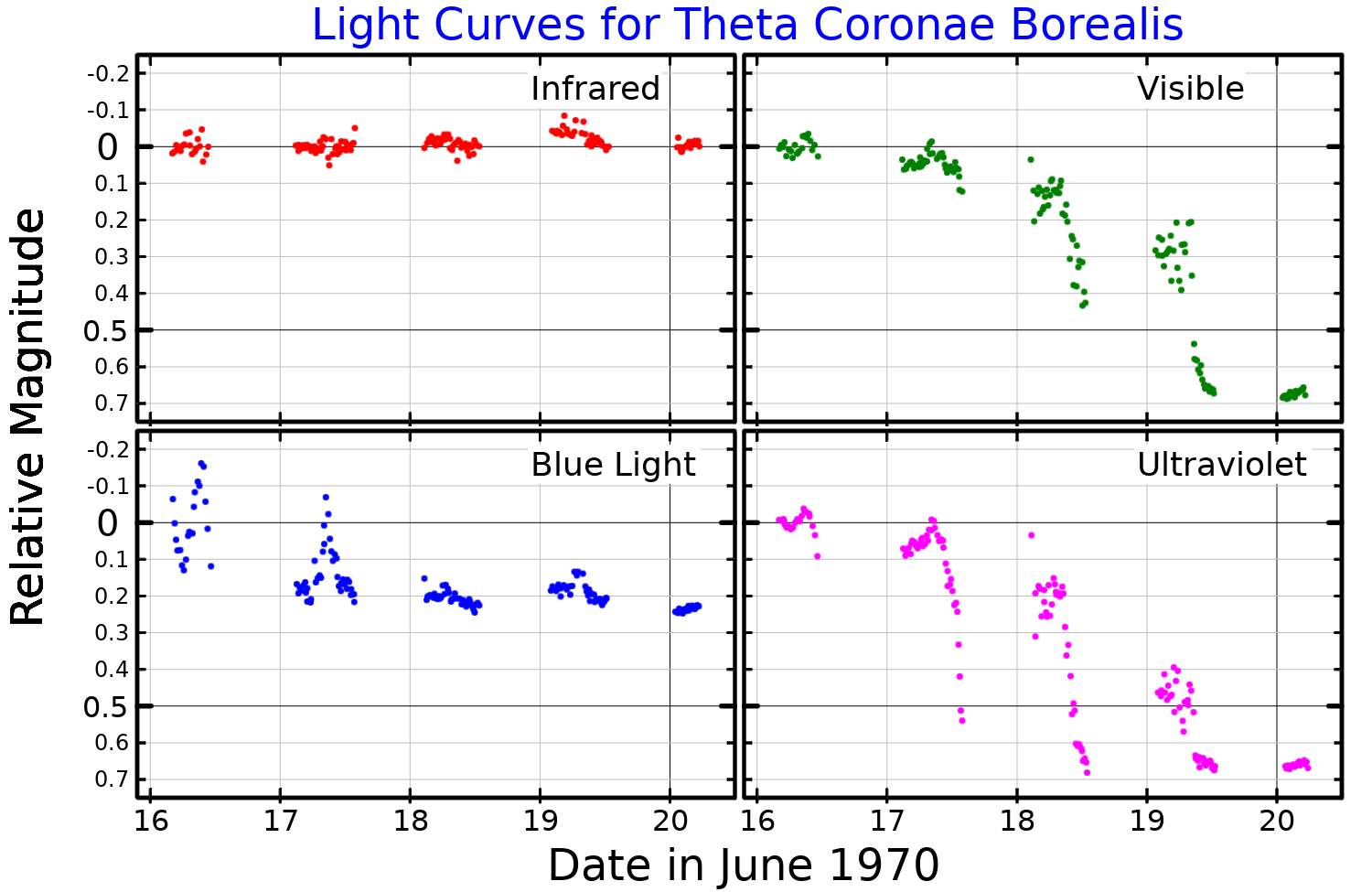
y, v, b and u light curves for the variability seen in Theta Coronae Borealis during 1970. Adapted from Roark (1971)

The brighter component, Theta Coronae Borealis A, is a blue-white star that spins extremely rapidly—at a rate of around 393 km per second. This rapid spinning is thought to be the cause of a gaseous disk that surrounds the star: such stars are known as Be shell stars, recognizable because the gas radiates emission lines that give a characteristic pattern in the star's spectrum. Of spectral type B6Vnn, Theta Coronae Borealis A is around six times as massive as the Sun and has four times the diameter. It has a surface temperature of around 14910 K. In 1970, it faded by 0.7 magnitude, becoming 50% fainter. The cause for this is unknown, but thought possibly due to ejection of dust that obscured the star's light.

Theta Coronae Borealis B is a A-type main sequence star of spectral type A2V that is around 2.5 times as massive as the Sun and located 86 astronomical units from the primary star. The two stars taking an estimated 300 years to orbit around a common centre of gravity.

In Chinese astronomy, a constellation of 9 stars in Corona Borealis, including this star, is known as Guàn Suǒ (Coiled Thong, 贯索). The IAU Working Group on Star Names adopted the name Guansuo for the primary star (Theta Coronae Borealis A) on 14 May 2026.
