= Kepler-11f =

Exoplanet orbiting Kepler-11

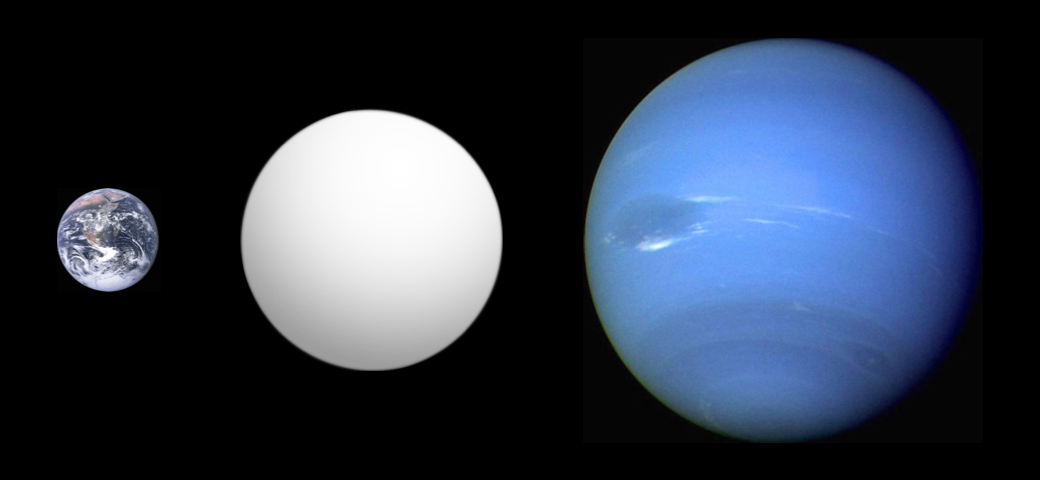
- Size comparison of Kepler-11f (gray) with Neptune and Earth

Discovery
- Discovery date: 2 February 2011
- Detection method: Transit (Kepler Mission)

Orbital characteristics
- Semi-major axis: 0.25 AU (37,000,000 km)
- Orbital period (sidereal): 46.68876 d
- Inclination: 89.4
- Star: Kepler-11

Physical characteristics
- Mean radius: 2.61 ± 0.25 R_{🜨}
- Mass: 2.3 ^{+2.2}_{−1.2} M_{🜨}
- Mean density: 0.7 ^{+0.7}_{−0.4} g cm^{−3}
- Temperature: 544 K (271 °C; 520 °F)

Kepler-11f is an exoplanet orbiting around the star Kepler-11 by NASA's Kepler space telescope, which searches for planets that transit (cross in front of) their host stars. Kepler-11f is the fifth planet from its star, orbiting one quarter of the distance (0.25 AU) of the Earth from the Sun every 47 days. It is the furthest of the first five planets in the system. Kepler-11f is the least massive of Kepler-11's six planets, at nearly twice the mass of Earth; it is about 2.6 times the radius of Earth. Along with planets d and e and unlike the two inner planets in the system, Kepler-11f has a density lower than that of water and comparable to that of Saturn. This suggests that Kepler-11f has a significant hydrogen–helium atmosphere. The Kepler-11 planets constitute the first system discovered with more than three transiting planets. Kepler-11f was announced to the public on February 2, 2011, after follow-up investigations at several observatories. Analysis of the planets and study results were published the next day in the journal Nature.

== Name and discovery ==
Kepler-11, known as KOI-157 when it was first flagged for a transit event, is the planet's host star, and it is included in the planet's name to denote that. Because Kepler-11f was discovered with five other planets, the planets of Kepler-11 were sorted by distance from the host star; thus, since Kepler-11f is the fifth planet from its star, it was given the letter "f." The name "Kepler" is derived from the Kepler satellite, a NASA Earth-trailing spacecraft that constantly observes a small patch of sky between the constellations Cygnus and Lyra for stars that are transited by, in particular, terrestrial planets. As these planets cross in front of their host stars with respect to Earth, a small and periodic dip in the star's brightness occurs; this dip is noted by the spacecraft and tagged for future study. Scientists then analyze the transit event more carefully to verify if the planet actually exists and to gather information on the planet's orbit and composition (if possible).

Follow-up observations were conducted at observatories at the W. M. Keck Observatory's Keck 1 telescope in Hawaii; the Shane and Hale telescopes in California; the Harlan J. Smith and Hobby–Eberly telescopes in Texas; telescopes at the WIYN (including MMT) and Whipple observatories in Arizona; and the Nordic Optical Telescope in the Canary Islands. The Spitzer Space Telescope was also used. According to NASA, Kepler-11's system is the most compact and the flattest system yet discovered, surpassing even the Solar System.

== Host star ==
Kepler-11 is a star, It is located 659 parsecs away in the constellation Cygnus. It has 95% the mass and 110% the radius of the Sun. Its mass and radius, combined with an approximate iron content (metallicity) of 0 and effective temperature of 5680 K, makes the star very similar to the Sun, though slightly more diffuse and slightly cooler. However, the star is approximately 1.74 times the age of the Sun, and is estimated to have existed for eight billion years. Kepler-11 has six known planets in orbit: Kepler-11b, Kepler-11c, Kepler-11d, Kepler-11e, Kepler-11f, and Kepler-11g. Kepler-11's five inner planets orbit closely to their host star, and their orbits would fit within that of Mercury's.

With an apparent magnitude of 14.2, Kepler-11 cannot be seen with the naked eye.

== Characteristics ==
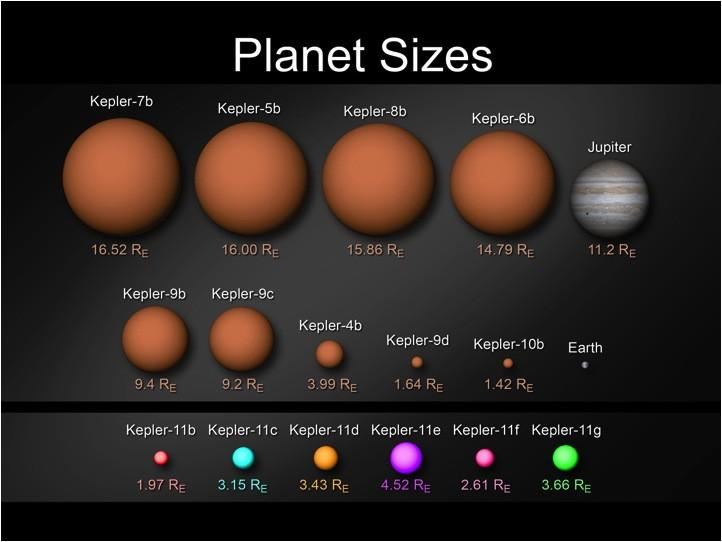
A comparison of the Kepler planets as compared to Earth, Jupiter, and previous Kepler finds. Kepler-11f is in pink at the bottom-right.

Kepler-11f is, at 2.3 times the mass of Earth, the least massive of the six planets discovered in the orbit of Kepler-11, although the planet's mass may range from 1.1 to 4.5, or from approximately that of Earth's mass to that of Kepler-10b, a rather large confidence interval. Its radius is the second smallest of the six planets discovered in the system at 2.61 times the radius of Earth. Kepler-11f has a density of about 0.7 g/cm^{3}, comparable to that of the Solar System's least dense planet, Saturn. Kepler-11f is the fifth planet from Kepler-11, orbiting its host star every 46.68876 days at a distance of 0.25 AU. Its orbital eccentricity is unknown. In comparison, Mercury orbits the Sun every 87.97 days at a distance of 0.387 AU. Kepler-11f has an orbital inclination of 89.4°; it can be seen almost edge-on with respect to Earth. Its surface equilibrium temperature is 544 K, over twice the surface equilibrium temperature of Earth and about two-thirds the surface temperature of Venus.

Kepler-11f's low density, characteristic of the outer planets of the system, suggests that a hydrogen–helium atmosphere is present on these planets, classifying it as "gas dwarf" due to its small size and mass. The gaseous content of the planet is calculated at a few percent of its total mass, but the envelope accounts for 70-80% of the planet's total volume. Kepler-11f's low density is not shared by the planets Kepler-11b and Kepler-11c because stellar irradiation has reduced their atmospheres to a thin layer. The planets accreted such atmospheres because they formed within the first few million years of the system's existence, when a protoplanetary disk was still present.
