= Kepler-11e =

Exoplanet orbiting Kepler-11

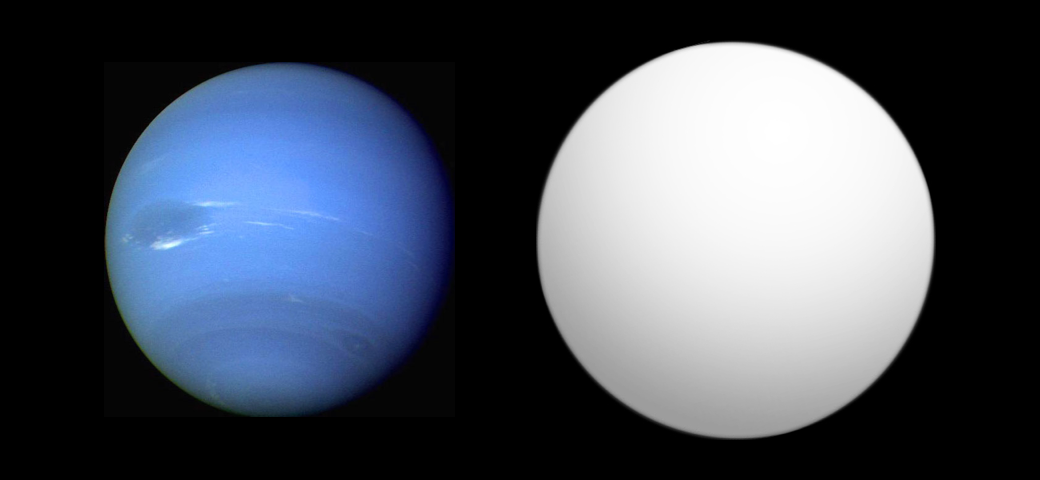
- Size comparison of Kepler-11e (gray) with Neptune.

Discovery
- Discovery date: 2 February 2011
- Detection method: Transit (Kepler Mission)

Orbital characteristics
- Semi-major axis: 0.194 AU (29,000,000 km)
- Orbital period (sidereal): 31.99590 d
- Inclination: 88.8
- Star: Kepler-11

Physical characteristics
- Mean radius: 4.52 (± 0.43) R_{🜨}
- Mass: 8.4 ^{+2.5}_{−1.9} M_{🜨}
- Mean density: 0.5 (± 0.2) g cm^{−3}
- Temperature: 617 K (344 °C; 651 °F)

Kepler-11e is an exoplanet orbiting around the star Kepler-11. It is the fourth of six planets around Kepler-11 discovered by NASA's Kepler space telescope. Kepler-11e was found by using the transit method, in which the dimming effect that a planet causes as it crosses in front of its star is measured. Kepler-11e is most likely a Neptune-like gas giant, having a density that is less than that of Saturn, the least dense planet in the Solar System. Its low density can probably be attributed to a large hydrogen and helium atmosphere. Kepler-11e has a mass eight times of Earth's mass and a radius 4.5 times that of Earth. The planet orbits its star every 31 days in an ellipse that would fit within the orbit of Mercury. Kepler-11e was announced on February 2, 2011 with its five sister planets after it was confirmed by several observatories.

== Name and discovery ==
At the time when Kepler-11 was first noted as a host to a potential transit event, the star was given the designation KOI-157. It was later assigned the name "Kepler-11" after the Kepler spacecraft, a NASA satellite tasked with discovering planets in transit of, or crossing in front of, their stars. This transit causes a slight and regular change in the host star's brightness, which can then tested to prove the planet's existence and, later, to extrapolate the orbital parameters of the planet. Kepler-11e is first given the designation by its host star, Kepler-11. Since Kepler-11e was announced with five other planets, the letters added to the star are sorted by the planet's distance from its star. Kepler-11e is the fourth planet from Kepler-11, it is given the designation "e".

Follow-up confirmation observations were made by the Keck 1 telescope at the W. M. Keck Observatory in Hawaii, the Hale and Shane telescopes in California, the Harlan J. Smith and Hobby–Eberly telescopes in west Texas, the Nordic Optical Telescope in the Canary Islands, and by telescopes at the WIYN (including MMT) and Whipple observatories in Arizona. The Spitzer Space Telescope was also used. Kepler-11's planetary system became the first discovered extrasolar system with more than three transiting planets, as well as the most compact and flattest system yet discovered, according to NASA. The planets of Kepler-11, including Kepler-11e, were announced jointly at a press conference on February 2, 2011. The findings were published in the journal Nature on February 3.

== Host star ==
Kepler-11 is a star located in the constellation Cygnus. It has a mass of 0.95 M_{sun} and a radius of 1.1 R_{sun}, and is thus almost the same mass and radius as the Sun. With an effective temperature of 5680 K, it is also almost as hot as the Sun, and with a metallicity of 0, Kepler-11 is almost as metal-rich as the Sun is. Metal-rich stars tend to have easily detectable planets because higher metallicities tend to either facilitate the creation of gas giants or to promote planetary migration, in which the planet orbits more closely to its star. However, Kepler-11 is almost 1.73 times older than the Sun, as it has an estimated age of eight billion years. Kepler-11 is 613 parsecs away from the Earth; its distance contributes to its apparent magnitude of 14.2 (V). It, thus, cannot be seen with the naked eye. Other than Kepler-11e, Kepler-11 is the host star of the planets Kepler-11b, Kepler-11c, Kepler-11d, Kepler-11f, and Kepler-11g. The inner five planets in the system orbit in a tightly knit configuration that would fit within the orbit of planet Mercury, while Kepler-11g, compared to its inner sister planets, orbits at a much further distance.

== Characteristics ==
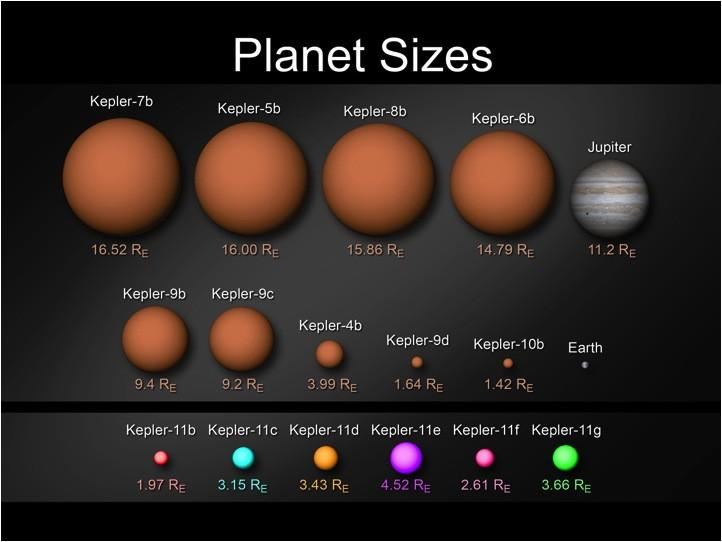
A comparison of the Kepler planets as compared to Earth, Jupiter, and previous Kepler finds. Kepler-11e is in purple at the bottom.

Kepler-11e, which formed within the first few million years of the star system's formation, has a mass 8.4 times that of Earth's, and radius 4.52 times that of Earth's. With a density of 0.5 grams/cm^{3}, Kepler-11e has a density that is half of that of pure water at standard temperature and pressure and slightly less than the density of Saturn. Kepler-11e has a surface equilibrium temperature of 617 K, and is thus has an equilibrium temperature approximately 2.4 times hotter than Earth's. Kepler-11e orbits its star at a mean distance of .194 AU, making it the fourth planet from its star. It completes an orbit every 31.995990 days. In comparison, Mercury orbits the Sun every 87.97 days at a distance of 0.387 AU. Kepler-11e's orbital inclination is 88.8°, making it almost entirely edge-on to its star as seen from Earth.

Because it isn't as close to its star as its sister planets Kepler-11b and Kepler-11c, the Kepler team suggests that its light density may come from a large hydrogen and helium atmosphere that has not been blown away by the stellar wind. In fact, formation models indicate that the planet has a gaseous envelope, somewhat less massive than 20% of it total mass, which account for ≈60% of its radius (or ≈90% of its volume).
