= Kepler-11c =

Exoplanet orbiting Kepler-11

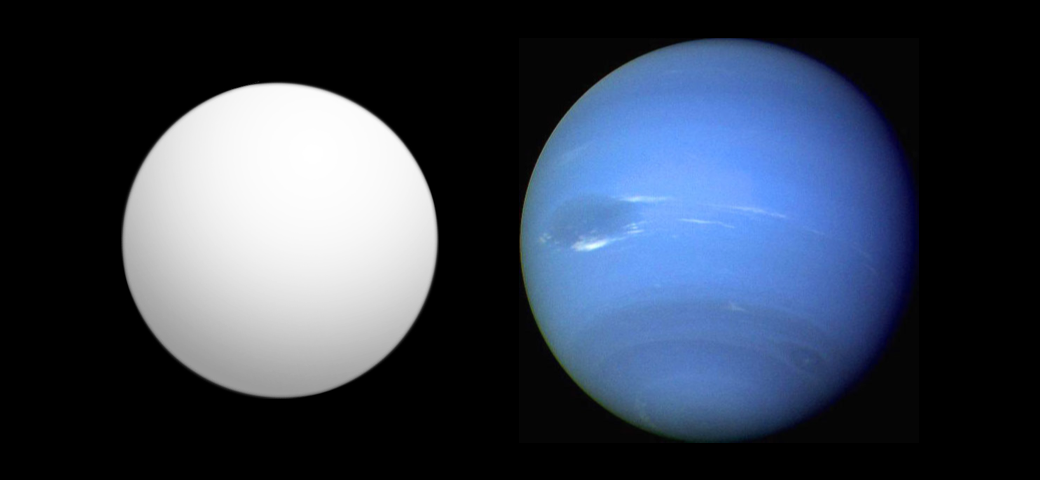
- Size comparison of Kepler-11c (gray) with Neptune.

Discovery
- Discovery date: 2 February 2011
- Detection method: Transit (Kepler Mission)

Orbital characteristics
- Semi-major axis: 0.106 AU (15,900,000 km)
- Orbital period (sidereal): 13.02502 d
- Inclination: 89
- Star: Kepler-11

Physical characteristics
- Mean radius: 3.15 (± .30) R_{🜨}
- Mass: 13.5^{+4.8}_{−6.1} M_{🜨}
- Mean density: 2.3 ^{+1.3}_{−1.1} g cm^{−3}
- Temperature: 833 K (560 °C; 1,040 °F)

Kepler-11c is an exoplanet orbiting around the star Kepler-11 by the Kepler space telescope, a NASA telescope aiming to discover Earth-like planets. It is the second planet from its star, and is most likely a water planet with a thin hydrogen–helium atmosphere. Kepler-11c orbits Kepler-11 every 10 days, and has an estimated density twice that of pure water. It is estimated to have a mass thirteen times that of Earth and a radius three times that of Earth. Kepler-11c and its five sister planets form the first discovered system with more than three transiting planets. The Kepler-11 system also holds the record of being the most compact and the flattest system discovered. Kepler-11c and the other Kepler-11 planets were announced to the public on February 2, 2011, and was published in Nature a day later.

== Name and discovery ==
Kepler-11c's name is divided into two parts: it is named for Kepler-11, the star around which it orbits. As planets with discoveries that are announced at the same time are sorted by distance, Kepler-11c's "c" is because it was the second-closest planet from its host star at the time of discovery (Kepler-11b is the closest). Kepler-11, the host star, was named for the Kepler satellite, a NASA telescope that searches for terrestrial planets by measuring small fluctuations in the light of stars that occurs when celestial bodies transit, or cross in front of, the star with respect to Earth. Kepler-11 was flagged as home to a potential transit event by the satellite, and was given the designation KOI-157. After further observations, Kepler-11c's existence was confirmed by the observation of an orbital resonance effect between Kepler-11b and Kepler-11c. Along with the other five planets in orbit around Kepler-11, Kepler-11c was announced on February 2, 2011 at a press conference. Its findings were published on February 3 in the journal Nature. The Kepler-11 system is the first known to host more than three transiting planets.

Follow-up observations were conducted by the Hale and the C. Donald Shane telescopes in California; MMT, WIYN, and Tillinghast telescopes in Arizona; the Keck I telescope in Hawaii; the Hobby–Eberly and Smith telescopes in Texas; and the Nordic Optical Telescope in the Canary Islands.

== Host star ==
Kepler-11 is a star 2,000 light-years away in the constellation Cygnus. With a mass of .95 M_{sun}, a radius of 1.1 R_{sun}, a metallicity of [Fe/H] = 0, and an effective temperature of 5680 (± 100) K, Kepler-11 is almost identical to the Sun in terms of radius, mass, and temperature. However, Kepler-11 is much older than the Sun, with an estimated age of 8 (± 2) billion years (the Sun is approximately 4.6 billion years old). Along with Kepler-11c, Kepler-11 is host to the planets Kepler-11b, Kepler-11d, Kepler-11e, Kepler-11f, and Kepler-11g. The inner five planets' orbits would fit within the orbit of planet Mercury, while Kepler-11g orbits Kepler-11 at a much further distance in comparison to the inner components.

With an apparent magnitude of 14.2, Kepler-11 cannot be seen from Earth with the naked eye.

== Characteristics ==
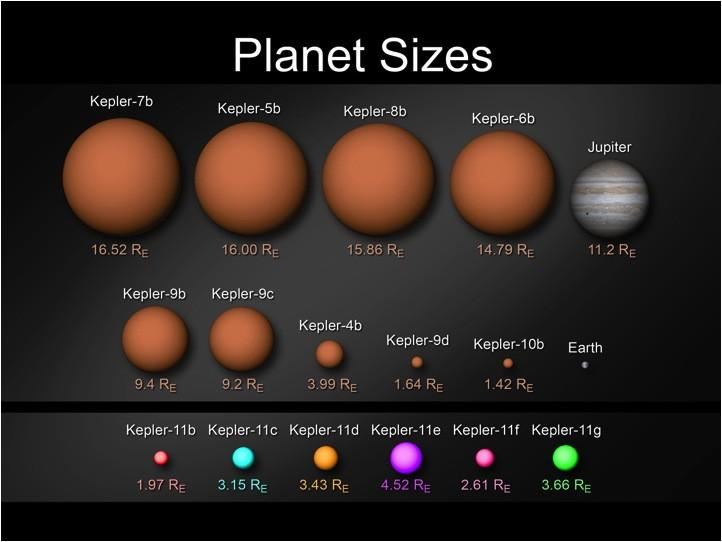
A comparison of the Kepler planets as compared to Earth, Jupiter, and previous Kepler finds. Kepler-11c is in blue at bottom left.

Kepler-11c has a mass of 13.5 M_{E} and a radius of 3.15 R_{E}, making it over 13.5 times the mass of earth, but approximately 3.15 times its radius. Neptune, in comparison, has a radius approximately 3.9 times that of Earth. With a density of 2.3 grams/cm^{3}, Kepler-11c has a mass over double of that of pure water at 0 °C; it is also denser than all the Sun's gas giants, but less dense than any of its rocky planets. Its density is closest to the dwarf planet Pluto. Due in part to its proximity to its star, the planet's equilibrium temperature is 833 K, about three times hotter than Earth's average temperature. It orbits Kepler-11 every 13.02502 days at a distance of .106 AU; it is Kepler-11's second-closest planet. Mercury, in comparison, orbits every 87.97 days at a distance of .387 AU. The orbit's inclination of Kepler-11c is 89°, and is thus almost edge-on as seen from Earth.

The Kepler team has said that Kepler-11b and Kepler-11c are probably composed mostly of water with a thin hydrogen and helium atmosphere. In comparison to the outer planets of the system, which probably have large hydrogen and helium atmospheres, Kepler-11c's proximity to its star has blown off most of its atmosphere. In fact, formation and evolution calculations indicate that Kepler-11c lost over 50% (by mass) of the hydrogen envelope it had accreted after formation. Support to the idea that the planets of this system formed ex situ and contain large amounts of H_{2}O is provided by the radius of Kepler-11b, which can only be explained by the presence of a thin gaseous envelope. However, since hydrogen and helium cannot survive for the age of the system bound to the planet because of photo-evaporation blow-off, the most likely alternative is the presence of a vapor atmosphere generating from its surface.

Kepler-11 and its six-planet system form what NASA considers to be the most compact and flattest planetary system yet discovered. Kepler-11b and Kepler-11c orbit Kepler-11 with a phenomenon called orbital resonance, a gravitational tugging that keeps their orbits stable at a ratio of the orbital periods close to 5:4 . Orbital resonances can arise from orbital migration during formation. Kepler-11c may be at risk of eventually colliding with b due to a precarious orbital configuration in which a secular resonance could emerge and cause planet b's orbit to become dangerously eccentric.
