= Kepler-11d =

Exoplanet orbiting Kepler-11

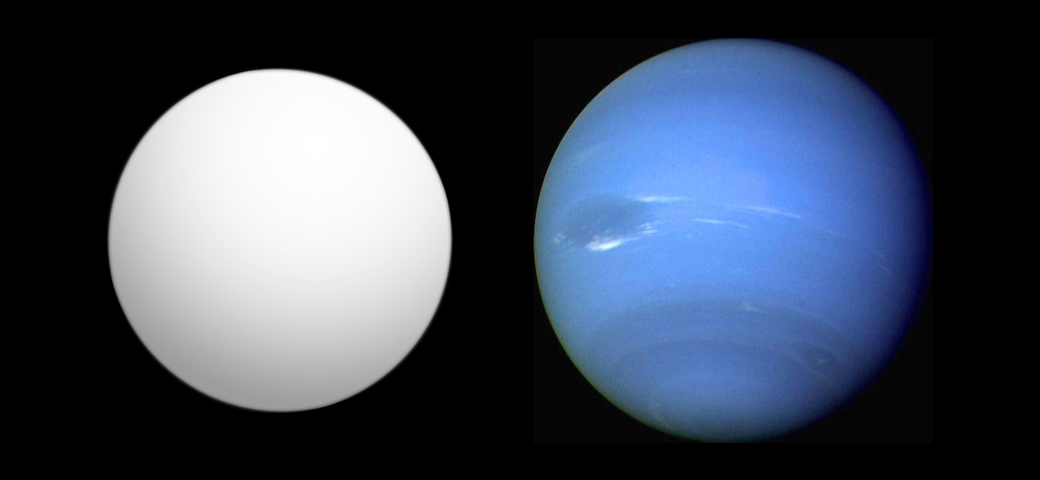
- Size comparison of Kepler-11 d (gray) with Neptune.

Discovery
- Discovery date: 2 February 2011
- Detection method: Transit (Kepler Mission)

Orbital characteristics
- Semi-major axis: 0.159 AU (23,800,000 km)
- Orbital period (sidereal): 22.68719 d
- Inclination: 89.3
- Star: Kepler-11

Physical characteristics
- Mean radius: 3.43 (± .32) R_{🜨}
- Mass: 6.1 ^{+3.1}_{−1.7} M_{🜨}
- Mean density: 0.9 g/cm^{3} (0.033 lb/cu in)
- Temperature: 692 K (419 °C; 786 °F)

Kepler-11d is an exoplanet orbiting around the star Kepler-11. It is named for the telescope that discovered it, a NASA spacecraft named Kepler that is designed to detect Earth-like planets by measuring small dips in the brightness of their host stars as the planets cross in front. This process, known as the transit method, was used to note the presence of six planets in orbit around Kepler-11, of which Kepler-11d is the third from its star. Kepler-11d orbits Kepler-11 well within the orbit of Mercury approximately every 23 days. The planet is approximately six times more massive than the Earth, and has a radius that is three and a half times larger than that of Earth's. It is, however, far hotter than Earth is. Its low density, comparable to that of Saturn, suggests that Kepler-11d has a large hydrogen–helium atmosphere. Kepler-11d was announced with its five sister planets on February 2, 2011 after extensive follow-up studies.

== Name and discovery ==
As with all exoplanets, Kepler-11d is named first for its host star, Kepler-11. Because Kepler-11d was announced at the same time as the five other planets in the system, their names are sorted by their distances from the host star; thus, because Kepler-11d is the third planet from Kepler-11, it was given the designation d. Kepler-11 was named for the Kepler space telescope, a NASA Earth-trailing satellite purposed with discovering Earth-like planets in a small area of the sky between the constellations Cygnus and Lyra by observing planets that transit, or cross in front of, their host stars with respect to Earth. The transit causes the star's brightness to dim slightly and at a regular rate, a phenomenon that the Kepler satellite notes till future study can prove or disprove the existence of a planetary body. Kepler-11d was flagged by Kepler-11, given the designation KOI-157.

Required follow-up observations were conducted at the Hale and Shane telescopes in California; the W. M. Keck Observatory's Keck I telescope in Hawaii; telescopes at the WIYN, Whipple, and MMT observatories in Arizona; and the Hobby–Eberly and Harlan J. Smith telescopes of west Texas. Additionally, the Spitzer Space Telescope was used. Kepler-11d, along with its five sister planets, were announced to the public on February 2, 2011. Its discovery paper was published in the journal Nature the next day.

== Host star ==
Kepler-11 is a star in the constellation Cygnus. With a mass of .95 M_{sun}, a radius of 1.1 R_{sun}, a measured metallicity of 0, and an effective temperature of 5680 K, Kepler-11 is near in mass (95% of Sun), radius (110% of Sun), and iron content as the Sun. Metallicity has been observed to play a major role determining the type of planet a star forms. As metal-rich gas clouds tend to cause planetary cores to aggregate to a gravitationally prominent size while primordial gases still exist in the system, gas giants tend to form under such conditions. It is also slightly cooler than the Sun. However, it is estimated to be eight (± two) billion years old, far older than the Sun is. Kepler-11 is host to five other planets other than Kepler-11d: Kepler-11b, Kepler-11c, Kepler-11e, Kepler-11f, and Kepler-11g. The first five planets in the system have orbits that would collectively fit inside the orbit of planet Mercury, while Kepler-11g orbits at a considerably further distance in relation to the orbits of its inner counterparts.

At a distance of approximately 659 parsecs,

== Characteristics ==
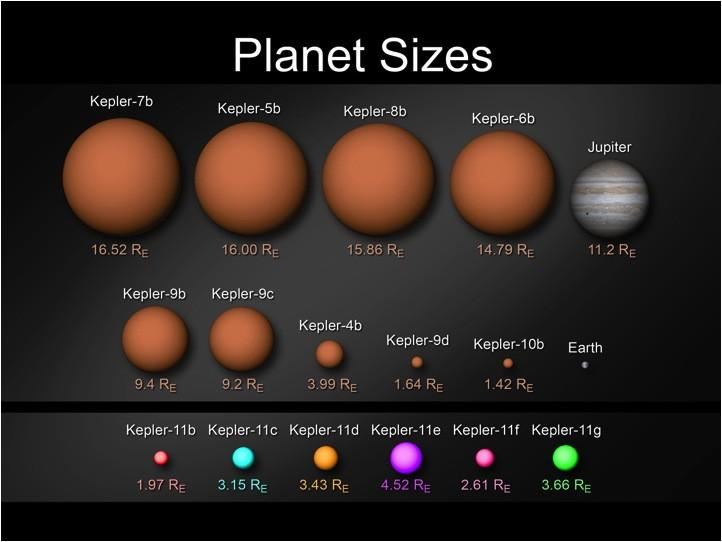
A comparison of the Kepler planets as compared to Earth, Jupiter, and previous Kepler finds. Kepler-11d is in orange at the bottom.

Kepler-11d has a mass of 6.1 M_{E} and a radius of 3.43 R_{E}, making it some six times more massive than Earth with nearly three and a half times the radius. With a density of .9 grams/cm^{3}, Kepler-11d's density is less than that of water and comparable to that of the gas giant Saturn. This suggests that, unlike its sister planets Kepler-11b and Kepler-11c, which are closer to their host star, Kepler-11d has maintained a large (in volume) atmosphere that is most likely composed of hydrogen and helium. Nonetheless, formation models indicate that most of the mass is accounted for by heavy elements and that the mass fraction of hydrogen/helium is less than 10%. Kepler-11d has an equilibrium temperature of 692 K, nearly 2.7 times the equilibrium temperature of Earth. Kepler-11d orbits at a mean distance of .159 AU from its host star and completes an orbit every 22.68719 days, making it the third planet from Kepler-11. In comparison, planet Mercury orbits the Sun every 87.97 days at a distance of .387 AU. Kepler-11d has an orbital inclination of 89.3°. Thus, Kepler-11d is almost exactly edge on with respect to Earth.

The presence of large quantities of hydrogen and helium on Kepler-11d, Kepler-11e, and Kepler-11f suggests that these planets formed within the first few million years of the system's existence, when gas could still be captured from the forming protoplanetary disc. In fact, according to detailed formation calculations, all planets of the system require some amount of hydrogen/helium in order to match their observed radii. The innermost planet, Kepler-11b, which likely lost all of its primordial light-element envelope, still requires a tenuous atmosphere (either made of steam or of gases sequestered in the heavy-element core) to account for its observed radius.
