= Daniel Cosgrove (biologist) =

American biologist and author (born 1952)

Daniel J. Cosgrove
- Born: 1952 (age 72–73)
- Scientific career
- Institutions: Pennsylvania State University

Daniel J. Cosgrove (born 1952) is an American biologist and author, currently the Eberly Family Chair of Biology at the Eberly College of Science, Pennsylvania State University. As an author and scientist, he is widely cited by his peers and also held in libraries worldwide.
