= Ross Hardison =

American biochemist and molecular biologist

Ross C. Hardison (born March 29, 1951) is an American biochemist and molecular biologist. He served on the faculty of the Pennsylvania State University for 43 years, and he was the T. Ming Chu Professor of Biochemistry and Molecular Biology in the Eberly College of Science of Penn State from 2005-2023. He is currently Professor Emeritus at the Pennsylvania State University.

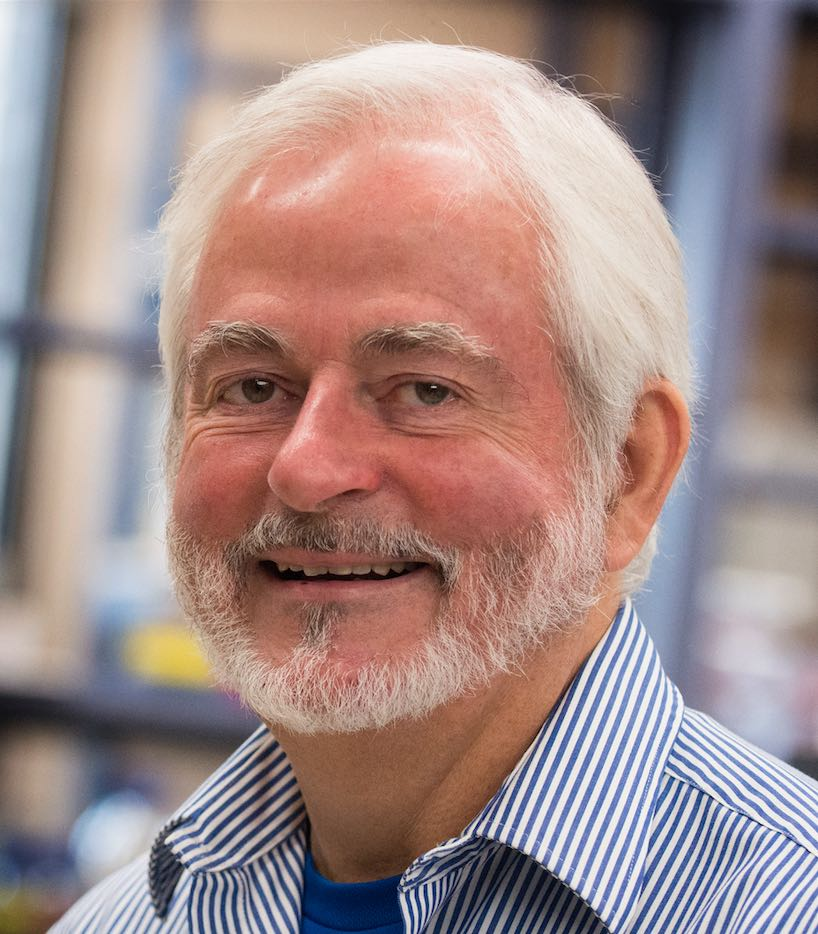
Photo of Ross Hardison, 2017

== Education and career ==
Hardison received a B.A. in chemistry from Vanderbilt University in 1973, where he did undergraduate research on steroid hormone analogs with Prof. Howard Smith. He did his thesis research on histone interaction patterns in chromatin in the laboratory of Prof. Roger Chalkley at the University of Iowa, receiving a Ph.D. in biochemistry in 1977. He then trained as a Jane Coffin Childs postdoctoral fellow with Prof. Tom Maniatis at the California Institute of Technology. He joined the faculty at the Pennsylvania State University in 1980 and was promoted to professor in 1991.

== Research ==
Hardison's research lab studied the molecular basis of gene regulation using genomic and epigenetic approaches, with a special emphasis on the erythroid and myeloid hematopoietic lineages of mouse and human. His research over five decades has investigated the genomics of gene regulation at many levels, from isolation of gene clusters from representative clone libraries of mammalian DNA to genome-wide determination and integrative analysis of epigenetic features and their association with regulated transcriptomes. One enduring theme of his research is the application of genomic and epigenomic analyses to the prediction of gene regulatory elements, including distal enhancers, followed by rigorous testing of those predictions experimentally. He and his collaborators have shown that strong signatures of evolutionary conservation, derived from whole-genome alignments, are good predictors of a subset of regulatory elements. Further, they have utilized systematic integration of epigenomic data to predict a broader set of regulatory elements, which were then evaluated and annotated for potential roles in different cell lineages. More information about his research and teaching is available from his website. Resources produced from his collaborative research are available from the VISION (ValIdated Systematic IntegratiON of hematopoietic epigenomic data) project website and the ENCODE data portal.

Hardison has published over 270 papers (listed in PubMed at this link), which have been widely cited by his peers (documented in Google Scholar at this link).

Some of Hardison's research presentations are available as videos online, including a keynote address at the Rat Genomics and Models meeting at Cold Spring Harbor Laboratory (Dec. 11, 2013) and a talk on "A VISION for integration & application of ENCODE data in differentiating blood cells" for an ENCODE User's meeting (Oct. 08, 2020).
