= Corona Borealis Supercluster =

Supercluster in the constellation Corona Borealis

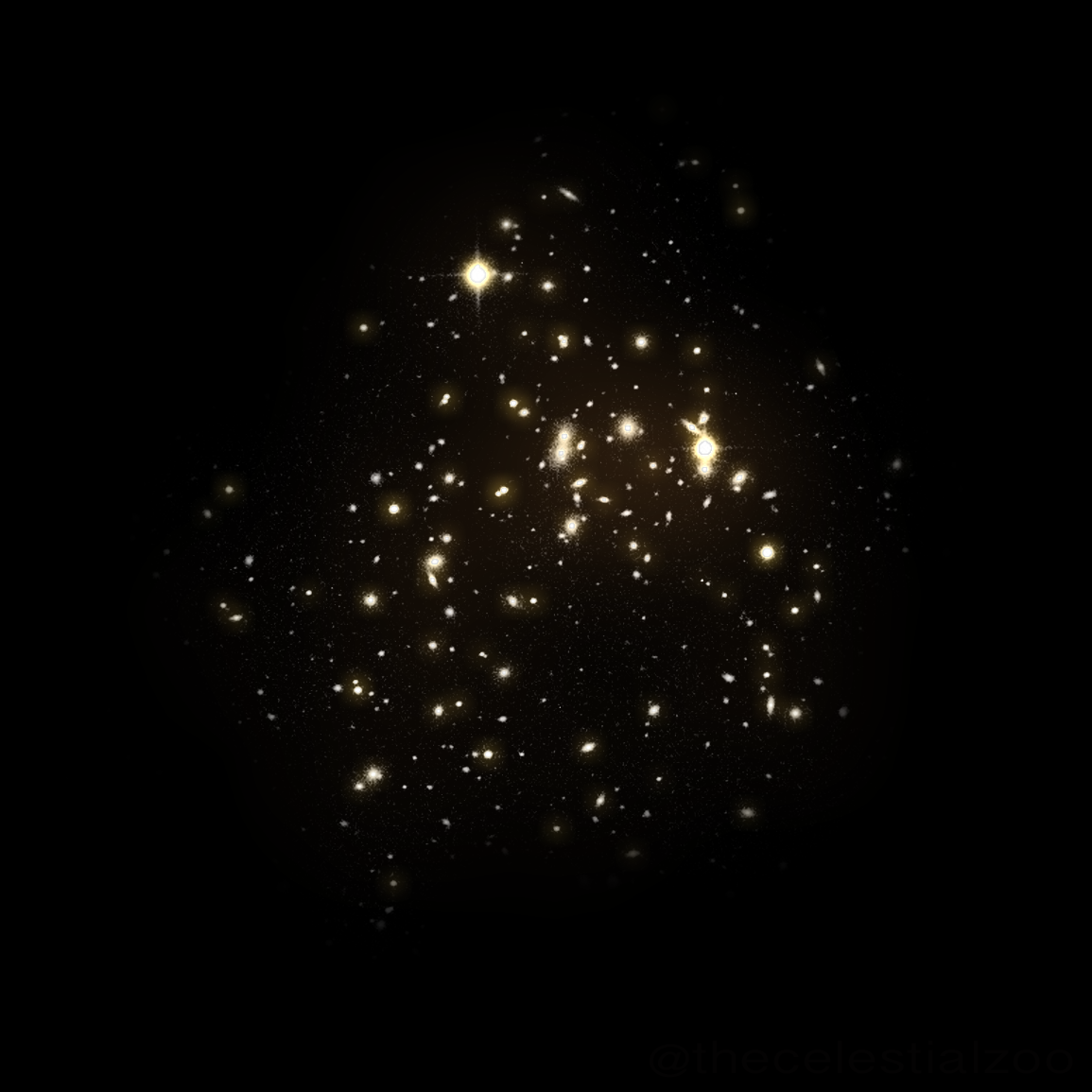
- Corona Borealis Supercluster view from Earth.

Observation data (Epoch )
- Constellation: Corona Borealis
- Redshift: 0.07
- Binding mass: (0.6–12)×10^{16} M_{☉}

Other designations
- MSCC 463; SCL 158

The Corona Borealis Supercluster is a supercluster located in the constellation Corona Borealis and the most prominent example of its kind in the Northern Celestial Hemisphere. Dense and compact compared with other superclusters, its mass has been calculated to lie somewhere between 0.6 and 12×10^{16} solar masses (M_{☉}). It contains the galaxy clusters Abell 2056, Abell 2061, Abell 2065 (the most massive galaxy cluster within the supercluster), Abell 2067, Abell 2079, Abell 2089, and Abell 2092. Of these, Abell 2056, 2061, 2065, 2067, and A2089 are gravitationally bound and in the process of collapsing to form a massive cluster. This entity has an estimated mass of around 1×10^{16} M_{☉}. If there is inter-cluster mass present, then Abell 2092 may also be involved. It has been estimated to be 100 megaparsecs (330 million light-years) wide and 40 megaparsecs (130 million light years) deep. It has a redshift of 0.07, which is equivalent to a distance of around 265.5 megaparsecs (964 million light-years).

== Observational history ==
Astronomers C. Donald Shane and Carl A. Wirtanen were the first to note a concentration or "cloud" of "extragalactic nebulae" in the region during a large-scale survey of extragalactic structures in the sky. George Abell was the first to note the presence of what he called "second-order clusters", namely clusters of clusters in the first publication of his Abell catalogue in 1958.

Postman and colleagues were the first to study the supercluster in detail in 1988, calculating it to have a mass of 8.2×10^{15} M_{☉}, and contain the Abell clusters Abell 2019, Abell 2061, Abell 2065, Abell 2067, Abell 2079, Abell 2089, and Abell 2092. Abell 2124 lies 33 megaparsecs (110 million light-years) from the center of the supercluster and has been considered part of the group by some authors.

Abell 2069 lies close by but is more distant, with a line-of-sight association only.

== See also ==
- Large scale structure of the universe
- List of Abell clusters
- List of superclusters
