= Kepler-11b =

Exoplanet orbiting Kepler-11

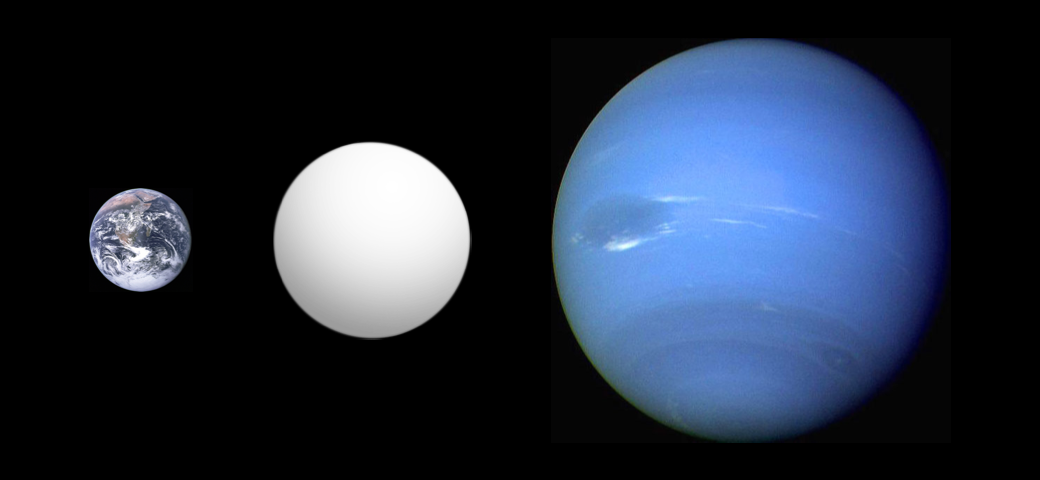
- Size comparison of Kepler-11b (gray) with Neptune and Earth.

Discovery
- Discovered by: Kepler team
- Discovery date: 2 February 2011
- Detection method: Transit (Kepler Mission)

Orbital characteristics
- Semi-major axis: 0.091 AU (13,600,000 km)
- Orbital period (sidereal): 10.30375 d
- Inclination: 88.5
- Star: Kepler-11

Physical characteristics
- Mean radius: 1.83^{+0.07}_{−0.04} R_{🜨}
- Mass: 2.78^{+0.64}_{−0.66}< M_{🜨}
- Mean density: 4.5^{+1.3}_{−1.3} g cm^{−3}
- Temperature: 900 K (627 °C; 1,160 °F)

Kepler-11b is an exoplanet orbiting around the star Kepler-11 by the Kepler space telescope; a NASA-led mission to discover Earth-like planets. Kepler-11b is a super-Earth, but less than about three times as massive and twice as large as Earth, but it has a lower density (≤ 3 g/cm^{3}), and is thus most likely not of Earth-like composition. Kepler-11b is the hottest of the six planets in the Kepler-11 system, and orbits more closely to Kepler-11 than the other planets in the system. Kepler-11b, along with its five counterparts, form the first discovered planetary system with more than three transiting planets—the most densely packed known planetary system. The system is also the flattest known planetary system. The discovery of this planet and its five sister planets was announced on February 2, 2011, after follow-up investigations.

== Naming and discovery ==
Kepler-11b is named in two parts. The first part of its name is derived from the fact that it orbits the star Kepler-11. As the discovery of Kepler-11b was announced simultaneously with those of other planets, Kepler-11b was given the designation b because it was the innermost of the six announced planets. The host star, Kepler-11, was named for the Kepler Mission that flagged it as host to several potential transit events under the name KOI-157. The Kepler satellite is a NASA-run space telescope that is tasked with the discovery of terrestrial planets that transit, or cross in front of, their host stars as seen from Earth. These transits cause fluctuations in the host star's brightness; these changes may suggest the presence of a planet, which can then be verified by follow-up observations.

Ground-based telescopes in California, Hawaii, the Canary Islands, Arizona, and Texas, as well as the Spitzer Space Telescope, were used to conduct these follow-up observations and verify Kepler-11b's existence. In particular, the detection of an orbital resonance effect between Kepler-11b and Kepler-11c confirmed the find. Kepler-11b's discovery was announced to the public on February 2, 2011. It is part of the first system discovered with more than three transiting planets, and is also part of the most compact and flat system yet discovered. Kepler-11's planetary system is the second known system to have multiple transiting planets, surpassing the three confirmed planets (two transiting) orbiting the star Kepler-9.

== Host star ==
Kepler-11 is a star in the constellation Cygnus that has a mass of 0.95 (± 0.1) M_{sun} and a radius of 1.1 (± 0.1) R_{sun}. In other words, Kepler-11 is approximately 5% less massive and 10% wider than the Sun. The star's metallicity is 0 (± 0.1), meaning that the level of iron (and, presumably, other elements) in the star is almost the same as that of the Sun. Metallicity plays an important role in planetary systems, and stars with higher metallicity are more likely to have planets detected around them. This may be because the higher metallicity provides more material with which to quickly build planets into gas giants or because the higher metallicity increases planet migration towards the host star, making the planet easier to detect. The star has five other known planets in orbit: Kepler-11c, Kepler-11d, Kepler-11e, Kepler-11f, and Kepler-11g. The first five planets in the system are all able to fit within the orbit of planet Mercury, while Kepler-11g orbits further out.

Kepler-11 has an apparent magnitude of 14.2. It is too dim to see from Earth with the naked eye.

== Characteristics ==
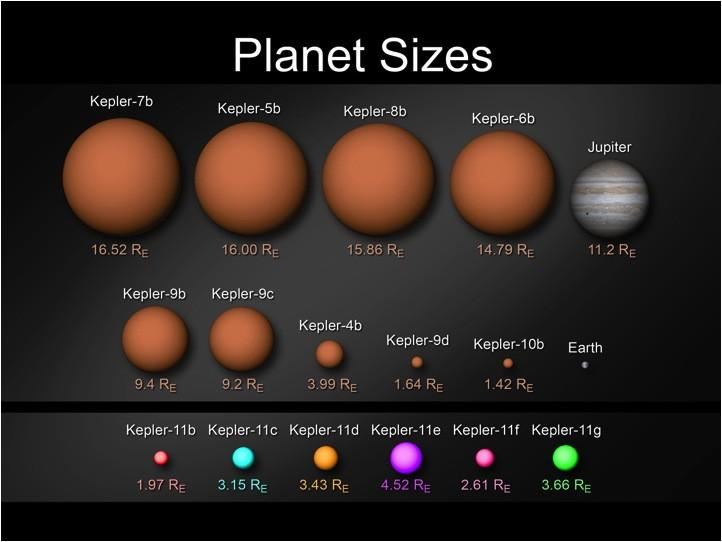
A comparison of the Kepler planets as compared to Earth, Jupiter, and previous Kepler finds. Kepler-11b is in red at bottom left.

Kepler-11b is estimated to be 2.78^{+0.64}_{−0.66} Earth masses and 1.8 Earth radii, making it around three times (or less) as massive and nearly twice as large as Earth. The mass is determined using transit timing variations of Kepler-11c, and is limited by the quality of the data. Kepler-11b is the closest planet to its host star in the Kepler-11 planetary system. With an estimated density of 4.5 g/cm^{3}, less than Venus's, Kepler-11b is denser than the solar system's gas giants but slightly less dense than the terrestrial planets. Early estimates have suggested that it is not of Earth-like composition, yet it is nonetheless composed mostly of elements heavier than helium. The planet's effective temperature is 900 K, and is thus the hottest of the planets discovered in the Kepler-11 system. Kepler-11b orbits its host star every 10.30375 days at a distance of .091 AU. Planet Mercury, in comparison, orbits the Sun every 87.97 days from a distance of .387 AU. Kepler-11b's inclination of 88.5° means that it deviates slightly from the orbital plane, but it does so more than the other five planets with which Kepler-11b was discovered.

=== Atmosphere ===
Kepler-11b close proximity to the star implies a strong insolation, which caused the planet to lose all of light-element envelope acquired during formation. The observed low density does require the presence of a gaseous envelope though, which was most likely produced via outgassing of hydrogen or evaporation of H_{2}O from the condensed core. The mass of atmosphere of Kepler-11b is not strongly constrained by observations, and may represent 0.04±0.03% of planetary mass - close to such value of Venus. For comparison, atmosphere mass ratio of Earth is 0.00008%.

=== Orbit ===
Kepler-11b and Kepler-11c orbit Kepler-11 with a strong orbital resonance, which gravitationally tugs the planets into stable orbits at a set ratio. The ratio of the resonance between Kepler-11b and c is 5:4. Kepler-11b's orbit is in a regime where secular resonance may abruptly destabilize its orbit; if this were to happen, it would most likely collide with c.
