= 1994 Shane =

Dark main-belt asteroid

Discovery
- Discovered by: Indiana University (Indiana Asteroid Program)
- Discovery site: Goethe Link Obs.
- Discovery date: 4 October 1961

Designations
- Named after: C. Donald Shane (American astronomer)
- Alternative designations: 1961 TE · 1939 RN
- Minor planet category: main-belt · (middle); Adeona

Orbital characteristics
- Epoch 4 September 2017 (JD 2458000.5)
- Uncertainty parameter 0
- Observation arc: 77.64 yr (28,358 days)
- Aphelion: 3.2332 AU
- Perihelion: 2.1282 AU
- Semi-major axis: 2.6807 AU
- Eccentricity: 0.2061
- Orbital period (sidereal): 4.39 yr (1,603 days)
- Mean anomaly: 298.87°
- Mean motion: 0° 13^{m} 28.56^{s} / day
- Inclination: 10.217°
- Longitude of ascending node: 244.73°
- Argument of perihelion: 89.669°

Physical characteristics
- Dimensions: 17.91±0.93 km 25.00 km (derived); 25.15±0.6 km (IRAS:19)
- Synodic rotation period: 8 h 8.220±0.001 h
- Geometric albedo: 0.0340 (derived); 0.0640±0.003 (IRAS:19); 0.129±0.014
- Spectral type: S
- Absolute magnitude (H): 11.6 · 11.81±0.86 · 12.3

1994 Shane, provisional designation 1961 TE, is a dark Adeonian asteroid from the central region of the asteroid belt, approximately 25 kilometers in diameter.

It was discovered on 4 October 1961, by astronomers of the Indiana Asteroid Program conducted at the Goethe Link Observatory near Brooklyn, Indiana, United States. It was later named after American astronomer C. Donald Shane.

== Orbit and classification ==
Shane is a member of the Adeona family (505), a large family of carbonaceous asteroids.

The asteroid orbits the Sun in the intermediate main belt at a distance of 2.1–3.2 AU once every 4 years and 5 months (1,603 days). Its orbit has an eccentricity of 0.21 and an inclination of 10° with respect to the ecliptic. It was first identified as 1939 RN at Simeiz Observatory in 1939, extending Shane's observation arc by 22 years prior to its official discovery observation at Goethe.

== Lightcurve ==
In October 2009, a rotational lightcurve of Shane was obtained from photometric observations at the Via Capote Observatory (G69) in California. It gave a well-defined rotation period of 8.22 hours with a brightness variation of 0.26 magnitude (U=3), superseding a previously obtained period of 8 hours from 1996 (U=n.a.).

== Diameter and albedo ==
According to observations made by the Infrared Astronomical Satellite (IRAS), Shane has an albedo of 0.06, while the survey carried out by the Japanese Akari satellite rendered a higher albedo of 0.13 with a corresponding diameter of 18 kilometers. The Collaborative Asteroid Lightcurve Link derives an even lower albedo of 0.04, yet does not classify it as a carbonaceous but rather as a S-type asteroid, which typically have much higher albedos due to their stony surface composition.

== Naming ==
This minor planet was named after American astronomer Charles Donald Shane (1895–1983), director of Lick Observatory, second president of AURA, and instrumental for the establishment of the Cerro Tololo Inter-American Observatory in Chile.

Shane played a major role in the planning and construction of the first telescopes and buildings on Kitt Peak National Observatory as well. The 3-meter C. Donald Shane telescope, located at Lick Observatory, was also named after him. The approved naming citation was published by the Minor Planet Center on 1 March 1981 (M.P.C. 5848).
