= Kepler orrery =

Group of exoplanet visualization animations

Example of a Kepler star system

The Kepler orrery is a group of animations created by Daniel Fabrycky and Ethan Kruse, which show exoplanets and stars discovered by the Kepler Space Telescope. 1,815 exoplanets and 726 planetary systems are in the animation.

The sizes of the planet orbits are to scale with each other, including the orbits of the planets in the local solar system out to Uranus. Current exoplanet discovery techniques are more likely to yield planets in tighter orbits around their stars. The sizes of the planets are at correct relative but not to absolute scale. The colors of the planets denote their estimated temperatures. All planetary systems seen in the animations have more than one transiting object, and the latest version was created by astronomy graduate student Ethan Kruse. In the description of the video Kruse said the size of the orbits are all to scale, but the size of the planets are not. The orbits are all synchronized such that Kepler observed a planet transit every time it hits an angle of 0 degrees (the 3 o’clock position on a clock).

== History ==
The orrery was created by Fabrycky, then a postdoc at the University of California, Santa Cruz, largely due to an accident. When he created an animation of a six-planet system Kepler-11 for his work on a home computer in 2011, his son and daughter were found playing with the program. Fabrycky added the other 170 planetary systems known at the time into the program, added the Rimsky-Korsakov's "Flight of the Bumblebee" music to reflect the insect-like swarming of the planets, and called the result the "Kepler Orrery" in commemoration of a mechanical model of the Solar system (orrery) built in 1700s.

== See also ==
- List of exoplanets discovered by the Kepler space telescope
- Visualization (graphics)
- Orbital mechanics

== Sources ==
- Lemonick, M.D. (2012). "The Kepler Era Begins". Mirror Earth: The Search for Our Planet's Twin. Bloomsbury Publishing. ISBN 978-0-8027-7902-1.
