= 11g =

11g may refer to:

- IEEE 802.11g-2003, wireless communication standard
- Kepler-11g, exoplanet
