= Abell 2067 =

Galaxy cluster in Corona Borealis

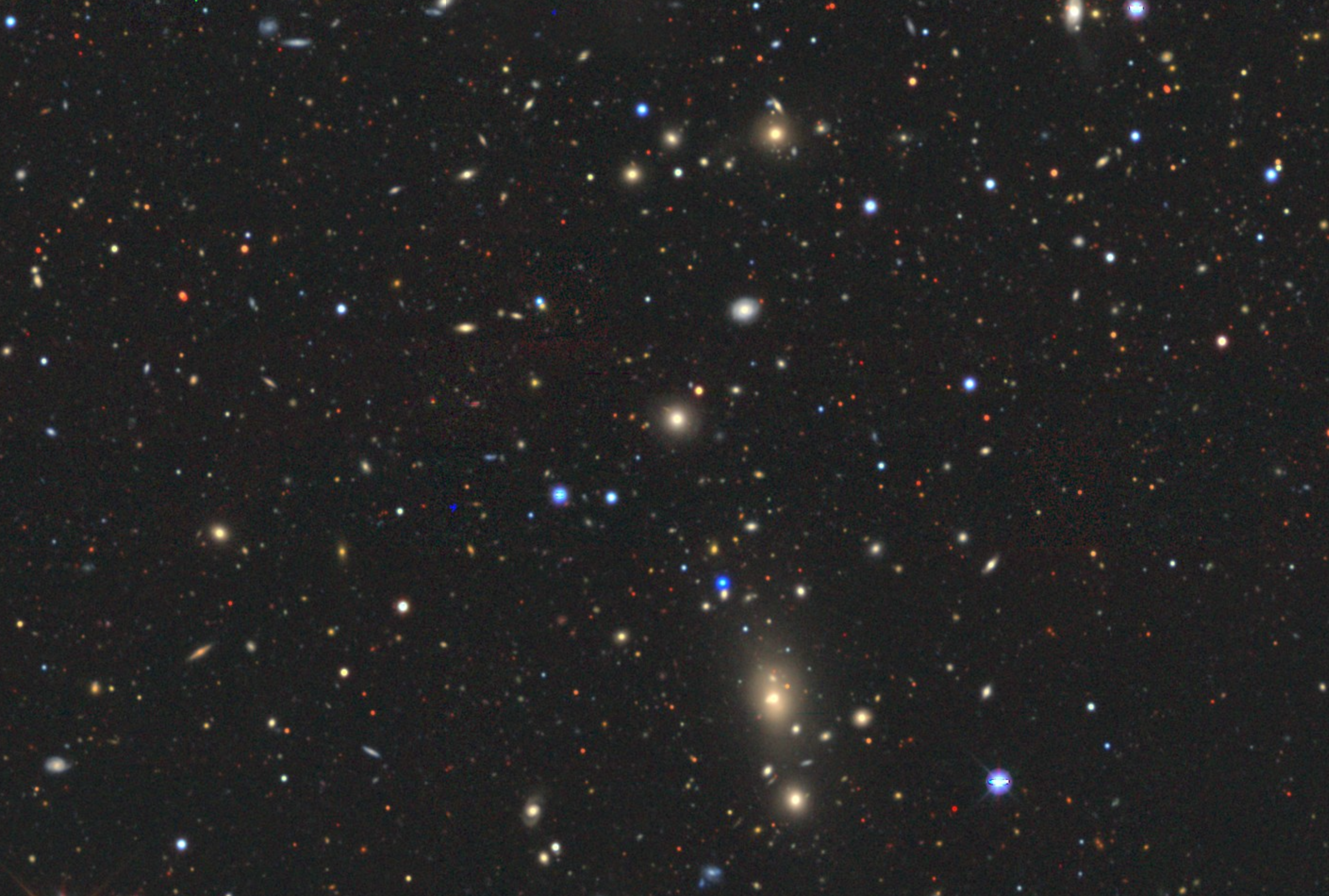
- Abell 2067 seen by DESI Legacy Survey DR11

Observation data (Epoch J2000)
- Constellation: Corona Borealis
- Right ascension: 15^{h} 23^{m} 21.9^{s}
- Declination: +30° 58′ 18″
- Redshift: 0.0740
- Distance: 426 MPC

Other designations
- Abell 2067; ABELL 2067; SCL 158 NED04; MCXC J1523.1+3050; [YSS2008] 274

Abell 2067 is a galaxy cluster in the Abell catalogue and is located in the constellation of Corona Borealis. On a larger scale, Abell 2067, along with Abell 2061, Abell 2065, Abell 2079, Abell 2089, and Abell 2092, make up the Corona Borealis Supercluster. Abell 2061 lies 1.8 megaparsecs south of it and the two are likely interacting.
