= Abell 2065 =

Galaxy cluster in the constellation Corona Borealis

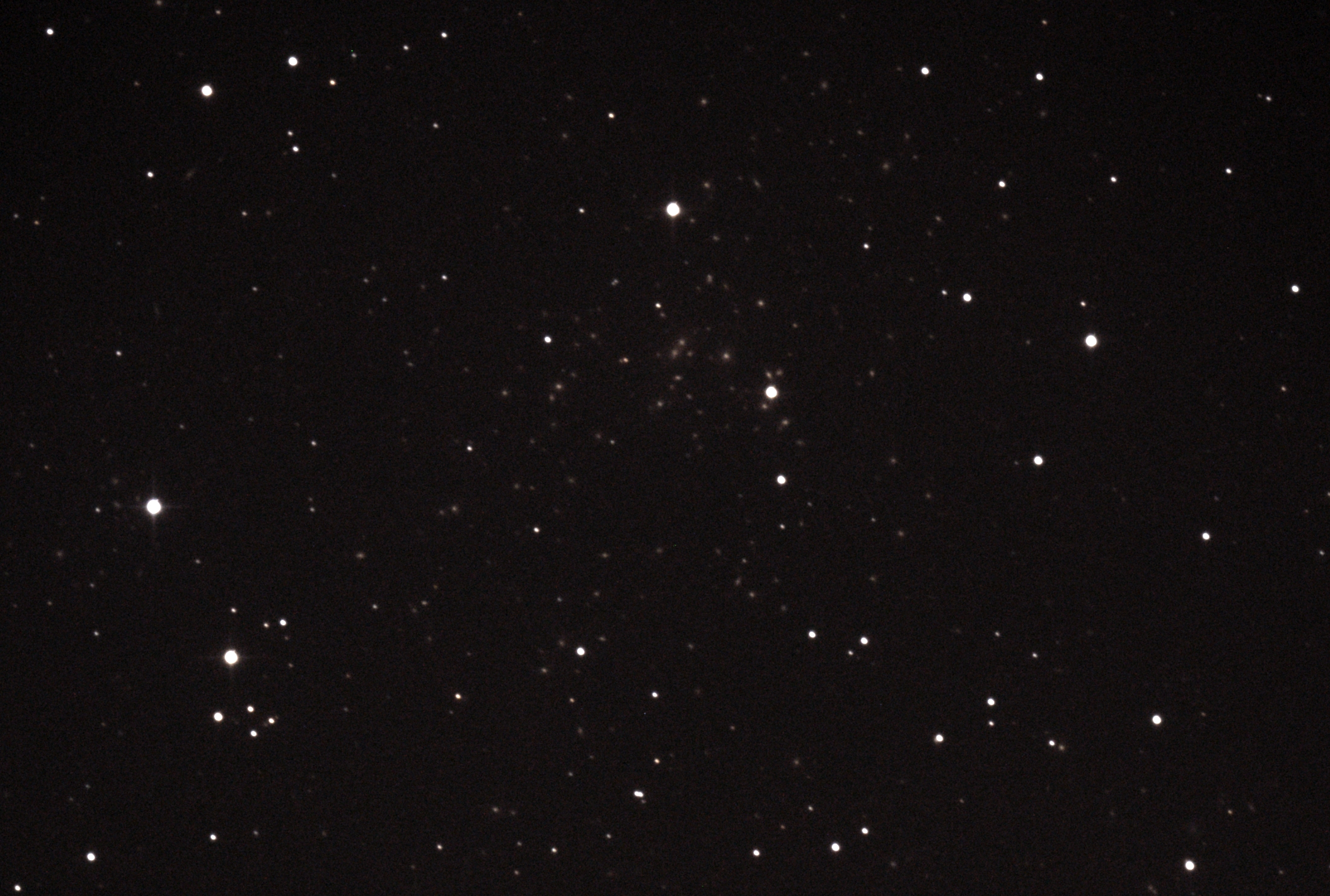
- Amateur image taken with 10" telescope

Observation data (Epoch J2000)
- Constellation(s): Corona Borealis
- Right ascension: 15^{h} 22^{m} 31.8^{s}
- Declination: +27° 42′ 04″
- Redshift: (21, 673 km/s)

Abell 2065 is a highly concentrated galaxy cluster in the constellation of Corona Borealis containing over 400 member galaxies, the brightest of which are 16th magnitude. The cluster is more than one billion light-years from Earth. On a larger scale still, Abell 2065, along with Abell 2061, Abell 2067, Abell 2079, Abell 2089, and Abell 2092, make up the Corona Borealis Supercluster.
