= Abell 2061 =

Galaxy cluster in the constellation Corona Borealis

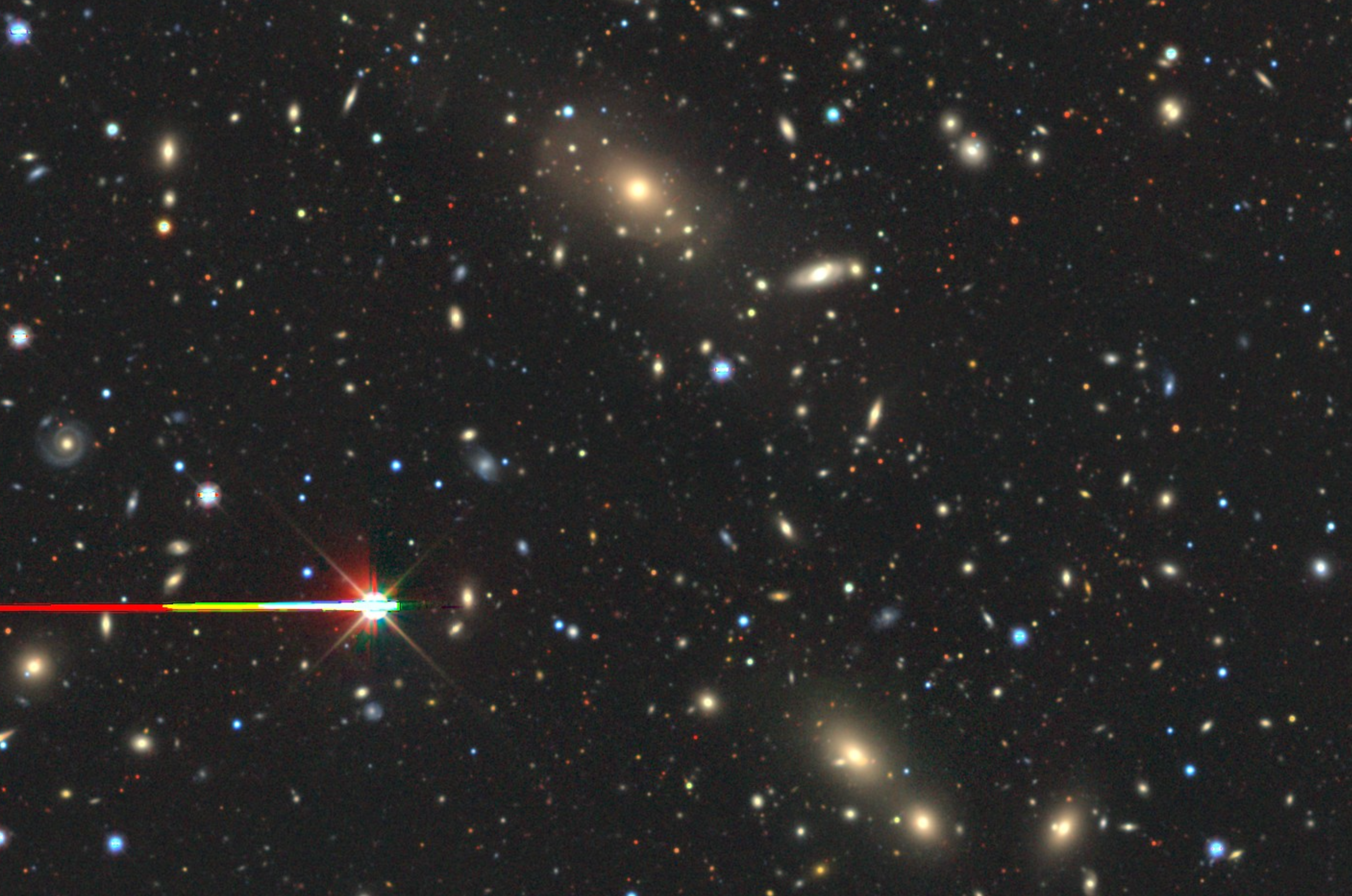
- Abell 2061 seen by DESI Legacy Surveys DR11

Observation data (Epoch J2000)
- Constellation: Corona Borealis
- Right ascension: 15^{h} 21^{m} 15.3^{s}
- Declination: +30° 39′ 17″
- Bautz–Morgan classification: III
- Redshift: 0.0784
- Distance: 306.000 Mega Parsec

Other designations
- Abell 2061; ABELL 2061; GCwM 220; MCXC J1521.2+3038; SCL 158 NED02

Abell 2061 is a galaxy cluster in the Abell catalogue. It is located in the constellation Corona Borealis and is 306 Mega Parsec away. On a larger scale still, Abell 2061, along with Abell 2065, Abell 2067, Abell 2079, Abell 2089, and Abell 2092, make up the Corona Borealis Supercluster or SCL 158. The Corona Borealis Supercluster is a Supercluster that consist of 8 galaxy clusters, namely Abell 2019, 2061, 2065, 2067, 2079, 2089, 2092, 2124.

It has a northeast southwest orientation and Abell 2067 lies 1.8 megaparsecs north of it.
