= C. Donald Shane =

American astronomer

Charles Donald Shane
- Born: Charles Donald Shane; 6 September 1895; Auburn, California
- Died: 19 March 1983 (aged 87)
- Education: University of California at Berkeley
- Occupations: Astronomer; planetary scientist; author; professor
- Known for: counting external galaxies, establishment of the Cerro Tololo Inter-American Observatory
- Spouse: Ethel L. Haskett (m. 1917)
- Children: W. Whitney Shane
- Scientific career
- Fields: Astronomy
- Thesis: (1920)

Charles Donald Shane (September 6, 1895 – March 19, 1983) was an American astronomer and director of the Lick Observatory of the University of California from 1945 to 1958, during which time he carried out a monumental program of counting external galaxies and investigating their distribution. During World War II from 1942 to 1945, he participated in the Manhattan Project. In the 1960s he was instrumental for the establishment of the Cerro Tololo Inter-American Observatory in Chile. He also played a major role in the planning and construction of the first telescopes and buildings on Kitt Peak National Observatory.

== Early life and education ==
Shane was born in 1895, on Futhey ranch near Auburn, California, the eldest of four children. His great-grandfather was from Ireland, his grandfather was born in Pennsylvania and his father Charles N. Shane was born in Adamsville, Ohio in 1861. Charles N. Shane moved to California in 1886, and worked as teacher in a one-room Lone Star School in Placer County. His mother was Annette Kidd, granddaughter of Captain Kidd, also a teacher in various one-room schools in Placer County. In 1894, his father was principal and the two married.

Shane attended Auburn Grammar School, Placer County High School and then his family moved to Oakland, California, where he attended Oakland High School (Oakland, California). In 1912, he entered the University of California at Berkeley to study astronomy, "only after the University of California advisors assured him that the Berkeley Astronomy Department was "outstanding and that he would have no problem finding a good position". He graduated one year early in 1915 and was appointed teaching fellow in mathematics, holding the Lick Observatory Fellowship with residence on Mount Hamilton (California) from 1916-1917 and in 1919-1920. During World War I Shane taught navigation in Oregon and Washington for the United States Shipping Board from 1917 until 1919. He received his Ph.D. degree in astronomy in 1920.

== Career ==
He began as an instructor in mathematics at the University of California at Berkeley, gradually transferring into astronomy. In 1924, he became assistant professor of astronomy, in 1935 he became professor in 1935, and chairman of the astronomy department in 1941.

During World War II from 1942 to 1945, he participated in the Manhattan Project. He was assistant director for scientific personnel of the Radiation Laboratory in Berkeley (now Lawrence Berkeley National Laboratory) and later at Project Y in Los Alamos, New Mexico.

From 1945 to 1958 he was director of the Lick Observatory of the University of California, during which time he carried out a monumental program of counting external galaxies and investigating their distribution.

He was second president of AURA, and instrumental for the establishment of the Cerro Tololo Inter-American Observatory in Chile. He also played a major role in the planning and construction of the first telescopes and buildings on Kitt Peak National Observatory. He remained part of the active faculty until retirement in 1963.

Shane was elected to the American Philosophical Society in 1955 and the United States National Academy of Sciences in 1961.

== Personal life and death ==
In 1917, Shane married Ethel L. Haskett, secretary at the Lick Observatory, who died two weeks after birth of their son Charles Shane in January 1919.

In 1920, Shane married Mary Lea Heger, to whom he was married until he died of leukemia in 1983. Heger had graduated from the University of California in 1919 and received her Ph.D. degree in astronomy in 1924, detecting sodium atoms in interstellar space. She abandoned her scientific career, gave birth to William Whitney in 1928, raised two small children, and served as hostess at Lick Observatory as the director's wife. She was crucial in establishing the Lick Archives in the University Library. She died July 13, 1983, of a heart attack on her eighty-sixth birthday 6 months after Shane died. His son Whitney Shane is also an astronomer.

== Legacy ==
- The 3-meter C. Donald Shane telescope at the Lick Observatory was named after him in 1978.
- The 1994 Shane asteroid was named after him.
