= Eberly College of Science =

College of Pennsylvania State University

- Established: 1859; 167 years ago
- Dean: Tracy Langkilde
- Students: 4,200 (Fall 2020)
- Undergraduates: 3,450 (Fall 2020)
- Postgraduates: 750 (Fall 2020)
- Location: University Park, Pennsylvania, U.S.
- Website: www.science.psu.edu

The Eberly College of Science is the science college of Pennsylvania State University in University Park, Pennsylvania. It was founded in 1859 by Jacob S. Whitman, professor of natural science. The College offers baccalaureate, master's, and doctoral degree programs in the basic sciences. It was named after Robert E. Eberly.

== Academics ==
Eberly College of Science offers sixteen majors in four disciplines: Life Sciences, Physical Sciences, Mathematical Sciences and Interdisciplinary Studies.

- The Life Sciences: Biology, Biochemistry & Molecular Biology, Biotechnology, Microbiology
- The Physical Sciences: Astronomy & Astrophysics, Chemistry, Physics, Planetary Science and Astronomy
- The Mathematical Sciences: Mathematics, Statistics, Data Sciences
- Interdisciplinary Programs: General Science, Forensic Science, Premedicine, Integrated Premedical-Medical, Science BS/MBA

== Faculty and alumni ==
Current Eberly faculty members include fourteen members of the United States National Academy of Sciences, considered one of the highest honors that can be bestowed upon a U.S. scientist, and three members of the British Royal Society. Eberly faculty members were the first to: "see" an atom (physicist Erwin Mueller); formulate covariant quantum gravity (physicist Abhay Ashtekar); discover practical synthesis of the pregnancy hormone progesterone (chemist Russell Marker); and discover planets outside the Solar System (astronomer Alex Wolszczan). University researchers also designed the world's largest optical telescope, the Hobby-Eberly Telescope.

College graduates include Nobel Prize winner Paul Berg and three U.S. astronauts. Mary Beth Williams was appointed the acting dean of the Eberly College of Science on April 15, 2024.
