= Kepler-11 =

Star in the constellation Cygnus

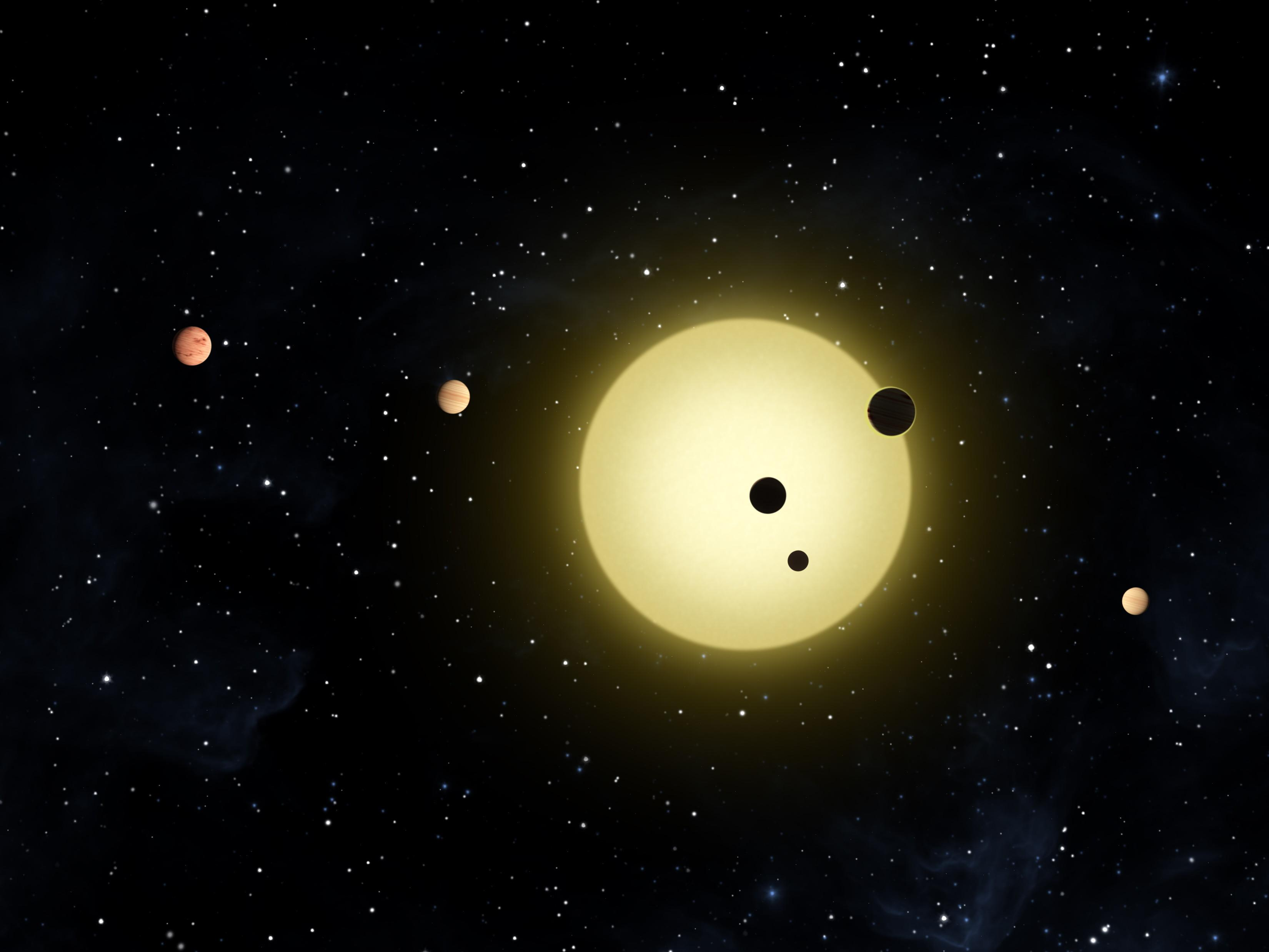
- Artist's conception of a simultaneous transit of three planets before Kepler-11 observed by NASA's Kepler space telescope on Aug. 26, 2010.

Observation data Epoch J2000 Equinox ICRS
- Constellation: Cygnus
- Right ascension: 19^{h} 48^{m} 27.6226^{s}
- Declination: +41° 54′ 32.903″
- Apparent magnitude (V): 14.2

Characteristics
- Evolutionary stage: Main sequence
- Spectral type: G3V

Astrometry
Proper motion (μ)	RA: 0.106(13) mas/yr Dec.: −7.103(15) mas/yr
Parallax (π)	1.5476±0.0117 mas
Distance	2,110 ± 20 ly (646 ± 5 pc)
Absolute magnitude (M_{V})	4.7

Details
Mass	1.042±0.005 M_{☉}
Radius	1.021±0.025 R_{☉}
Surface gravity (log g)	4.44±0.02 cgs
Temperature	5836±7 K
Metallicity [Fe/H]	0.062±0.007 dex
Rotational velocity (v sin i)	2.2±0.2 km/s
Age	3.2±0.9 Gyr

Other designations
- KOI-157, KIC 6541920, 2MASS J19482762+4154328

Database references
SIMBAD	data
Exoplanet Archive	data
KIC	data

Kepler-11, also designated as 2MASS J19482762+4154328, is a Sun-like star slightly larger than the Sun in the constellation Cygnus, located 2,110 light years from Earth. It is located within the field of vision of the Kepler space telescope, the satellite that NASA's Kepler Mission uses to detect planets that may be transiting their stars. Announced on 2 February 2011, the planetary system is among the most compact and flattest systems yet discovered. It is the first discovered case of a star system with six transiting planets. All discovered planets are larger than Earth, with the larger one being about Neptune's size.

== Nomenclature and history ==
Kepler-11 and its planets were discovered by NASA's Kepler Mission, a mission tasked with discovering planets in transit around their stars. The transit method that Kepler uses involves detecting dips in brightness in stars. These dips in brightness can be interpreted as planets whose orbits move in front of their stars from the perspective of Earth. Kepler-11 is the first discovered exoplanetary system with more than three transiting planets.

Kepler-11 is named for the Kepler Mission: It is the star with confirmed planets discovered in the Kepler field of view. The planets are named alphabetically: b, c, d, e, f, and g, distinguishers that are tagged onto the name of their home star.

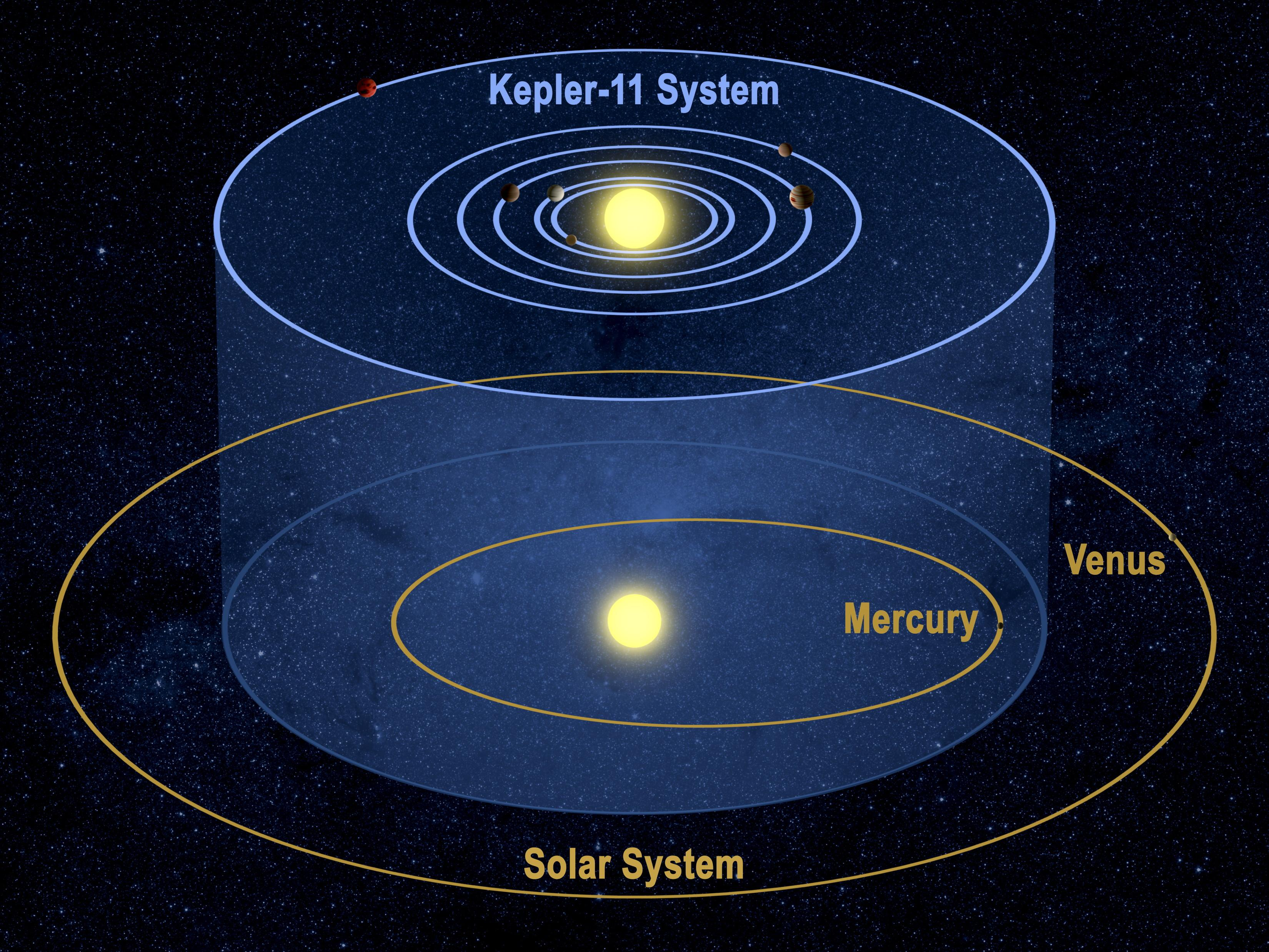
The orbits of the Kepler-11 planets in comparison to orbits of planets Mercury and Venus.

== Characteristics ==
Kepler-11 is a G-type main-sequence star that is approximately 104% the mass of and 102% the radius of the Sun. It has a surface temperature of about 5836 K and is estimated to have an age of around 3.2 billion years. In comparison, the Sun is about 4.6 billion years old and has a surface temperature of 5778 K.

With an apparent magnitude of 14.2, it is too faint to be seen with the naked eye.

== Planetary system ==
All known planets transit the star; this means that all six planets' orbits appear to cross in front of their star as viewed from the Earth's perspective. Their inclinations relative to Earth's line of sight, or how far above or below the plane of sight they are, vary by a little more than a degree. This allows direct measurements of the planets' periods and relative diameters (compared to the host star) by monitoring each planet's transit of the star. Simulations suggest that the mean mutual inclinations of the planetary orbits are about 1°, meaning the system is probably more coplanar (flatter) than the Solar System, where the corresponding figure is 2.3°.

The estimated masses of planets b - f fall in the range between those of Earth and Neptune. Their estimated densities, all lower than that of Earth, imply that none of them have an Earth-like composition; a significant hydrogen/helium atmosphere is predicted for planets c, d, e, f, and g, while planet b may be surrounded by a steam atmosphere or perhaps by a hydrogen atmosphere. The low densities likely result from high-volume extended atmospheres that surround cores of iron, rock, and possibly H_{2}O. The inner constituents of the Kepler-11 system were, at the time of their discoveries, the most comprehensively understood extrasolar planets smaller than Neptune. Currently, observations do not place a firm constraint on the mass of planet g (<25 M_{E}). However, formation and evolution studies indicate that the mass of planet g is not much greater than about 7 M_{E}.

Kepler-11 planets may have formed in situ (i.e., at their observed orbital locations) or ex situ, that is, they may have started their formation farther away from the star while migrating inward through gravitational interactions with a gaseous protoplanetary disk. This second scenario predicts that a substantial fraction of the planets' mass is in H_{2}O. Regardless of the formation scenario, the gaseous component of the planets accounts for less than about 20% of their masses but for ≈40 to ≈60% of their radii. In 2014, the dynamical simulation shown what the Kepler-11 planetary system have likely to undergone a substantial inward migration in the past, producing an observed pattern of lower-mass planets on tightest orbits. Additional yet unobserved gas giant planets on wider orbit are likely necessary for migration of smaller planets to proceed that far inward.

The system is among the most compact known; the orbits of planets b - f would easily fit inside the orbit of Mercury, with g only slightly outside it. Despite this close packing of the orbits, dynamical integrations indicate the Kepler-11 system has the potential to be stable on a time scale of billions of years. However, it may be approaching instability due to a secular resonance involving b and c. If this happens, b will most likely become eccentric enough that it collides with c.

None of the planets are in low-ratio orbital resonances, in which multiple planets gravitationally tug on and stabilize each other's orbits, resulting in simple ratios of their orbital periods. However, b and c are close to a 5:4 ratio.

There could conceivably be other planets in the system that do not transit the star, but they would only be detectable by the effects of their gravity on the motion of the visible planets (much as how Neptune was discovered). The presence of additional gas giant planets is currently excluded up to orbital distance of 30 AU.

The Kepler-11 planetary system
Companion (in order from star)	Mass	Semimajor axis (AU)	Orbital period (days)	Eccentricity	Inclination (°)	Radius
b	2.78^{+0.64}_{−0.66} M_{🜨}	0.091±0.001	10.3039^{+0.0006}_{−0.0010}	0.045^{+0.068}_{−0.042}	89.64^{+0.36}_{−0.18}	1.83^{+0.07}_{−0.04} R_{🜨}
c	5.0^{+1.3}_{−1.35} M_{🜨}	0.107±0.001	13.0241^{+0.0013}_{−0.0008}	0.026^{+0.063}_{−0.013}	89.59^{+0.41}_{−0.16}	2.87^{+0.05}_{−0.06} R_{🜨}
d	8.13^{+0.67}_{−0.66} M_{🜨}	0.155±0.001	22.6845±0.0009	0.004^{+0.007}_{−0.002}	89.67^{+0.13}_{−0.16}	3.12^{+0.06}_{−0.07} R_{🜨}
e	9.48^{+0.86}_{−0.88} M_{🜨}	0.195±0.002	31.9996^{+0.0008}_{−0.0012}	0.012^{+0.006}_{−0.006}	89.89^{+0.02}_{−0.02}	4.19^{+0.07}_{−0.09} R_{🜨}
f	2.43^{+0.49}_{−0.45} M_{🜨}	0.250±0.002	46.6888^{+0.0027}_{−0.0032}	0.013^{+0.011}_{−0.009}	89.47±0.04	2.49^{+0.04}_{−0.07} R_{🜨}
g	<25 M_{🜨}	0.466±0.004	118.3807^{+0.0010}_{−0.0006}	0.013^{+0.011}_{−0.009}	89.87^{+0.05}_{−0.06}	3.33^{+0.06}_{−0.08} R_{🜨}

Relative size and positions of the 6 planets of Kepler-11, and of the innermost Solar System for comparison.
The diameters of the planets (but not of the stars) are scaled up by a factor of 50.

== See also ==
- 55 Cancri
- Gliese 581
- HD 10180
- HD 110067
- Kepler Mission
- List of multiplanetary systems
