= Robert E. Eberly =

American philanthropist

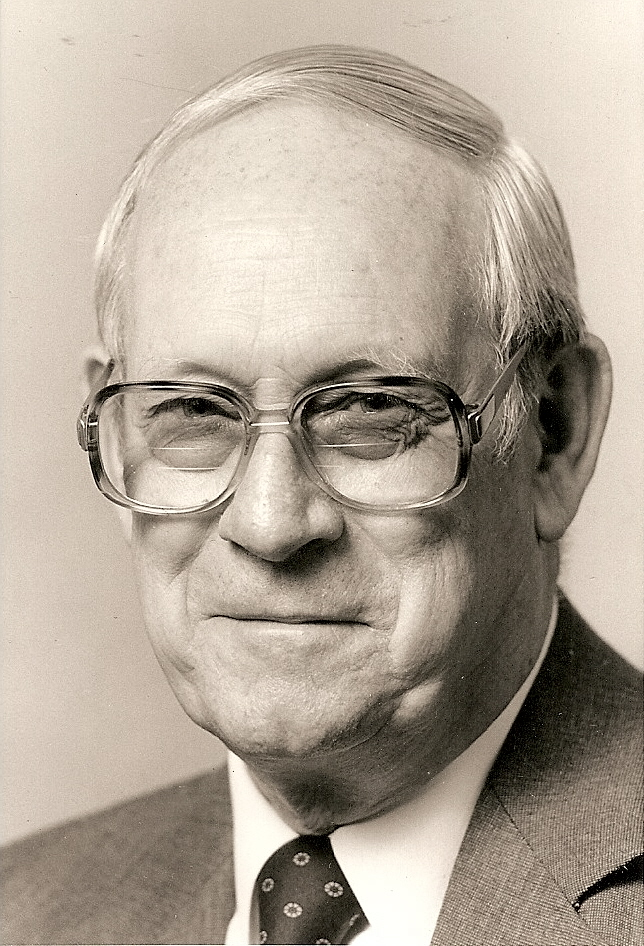
- Robert E. Eberly, Sr.
- Born: July 14, 1918
- Died: May 19, 2004 (aged 85)
- Education: Penn State (BS)
- Occupation: Eberly Natural Gas Company (Former Chairman of the Board)
- Spouses: Elizabeth Mitchell Eberly Elouise Eberly

Robert Edward Eberly (July 14, 1918 – May 19, 2004), son of Orville and Ruth Eberly, served as Chairman of the Board of Eberly Natural Gas Company, an oil and natural gas exploration and production firm. He was also a director of Gallatin National Bank (retiring in 1990). Eberly graduated in 1939 from Penn State with a BS in Commercial Chemistry.

On March 17, 1990, the College of Science at Penn State was renamed the Eberly College of Science in recognition of the support of the Eberly family. The Eberly family has also made donations to help build the Paterno Library addition and the Bryce Jordan Center at University Park campus, endow scholarships for Penn State Fayette Campus students and support higher education at Penn State and West Virginia University. Robert Eberly's sister, Carolyn Eberly Blaney and her husband W. Gerald Blaney, serve as trustees of the Eberly Family Trust, as did Eberly's sister Margaret Eberly George (d. 2000). His wife, Elouise R. (née Ross), is an honorary alumna of Penn State.

== See also ==
- Hobby–Eberly Telescope
