= Lone Star School =

Historic school building in Arkansas, US

- U.S. National Register of Historic Places
- Location within Arkansas Location within the United States
- Nearest city: Lone Star, Arkansas
- Coordinates: 35°13′20″N 91°30′5″W
- Area: less than one acre
- Built: 1920
- MPS: White County MPS
- NRHP reference No.: 91001355
- Added to NRHP: July 20, 1992

The Lone Star School was a historic one-room schoolhouse building in rural eastern Arkansas, United States. It was located southeast of Bald Knob, near the junction of Lone Star and Stokes Roads. It was a single story wood-frame structure, with a gable roof, novelty siding, and a foundation of brick piers. It had an interior brick chimney, and its classroom was finished in beaded wooden boards. Built in the 1920s, it was a rare example of a period rural schoolhouse in the county.

The building was listed on the National Register of Historic Places in 1992. It has been listed as destroyed in the Arkansas Historic Preservation Program database.

== See also ==
- National Register of Historic Places listings in White County, Arkansas
