= Kepler-11g =

Exoplanet orbiting Kepler-11

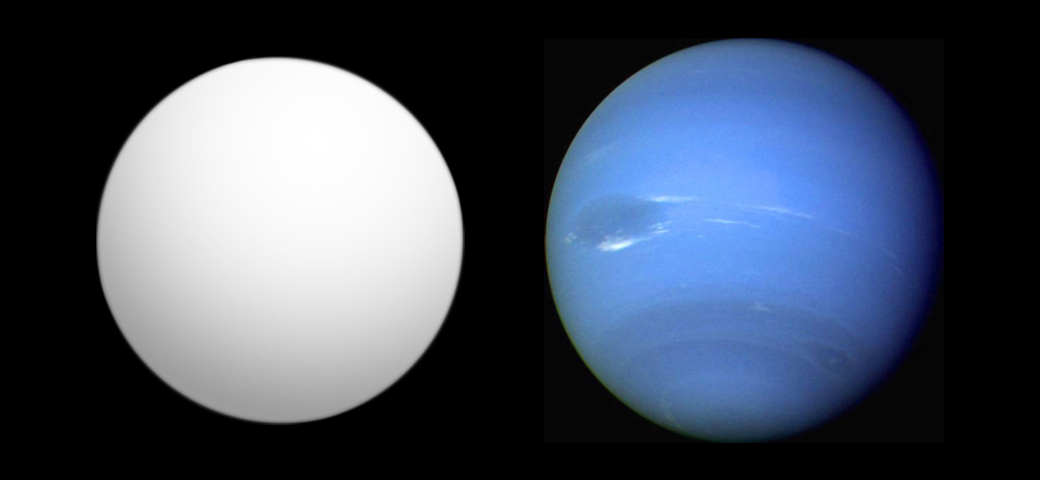
- Size comparison of Kepler-11g (gray) with Neptune.

Discovery
- Discovery date: 2 February 2011
- Detection method: Transit (Kepler Mission)

Orbital characteristics
- Semi-major axis: 0.462 AU (69,100,000 km)
- Orbital period (sidereal): 118.37774 d
- Inclination: 89.8
- Star: Kepler-11

Physical characteristics
- Mean radius: 3.66 (± 0.35) R_{🜨}
- Mass: <25 M_{🜨}
- Temperature: 400 K (127 °C; 260 °F)

Kepler-11g is an exoplanet orbiting the star Kepler-11 by the Kepler space telescope, a NASA satellite tasked with searching for terrestrial planets. Kepler-11g is the outermost of the star's six planets. The planet orbits at a distance of nearly half the mean distance between Earth and the Sun. It completes an orbit every 118 days, placing it much further from its star than the system's inner five planets. Its estimated radius is a little over three times that of Earth, i.e. comparable to Neptune's size. Kepler-11g's distance from the inner planets made its confirmation more difficult than that of the inner planets, as scientists had to work to exhaustively disprove all reasonable alternatives before Kepler-11g could be confirmed. The planet's discovery, along with that of the other Kepler-11 planets, was announced on February 2, 2011. According to NASA, the Kepler-11 planets form the flattest and most compact system yet discovered.

== Name and discovery ==
Kepler-11 was originally called KOI-157 when NASA's Kepler spacecraft flagged the star for possible transit events, which exhibit tiny and roughly periodic decreases in the star's brightness are measured as it passes in front of its star as seen from Earth. Kepler-11's name is incorporated into Kepler-11g's name because it is the host star. As Kepler-11g and its five sister planets were discovered and announced at the same time, its planets were sorted alphabetically by distance from the host star, starting with the letter b. Because Kepler-11g was the furthest of the six, it was given the designation "g."

The Kepler team's scientists conducted follow-up observations to confirm or reject the planetary nature of the detected object. To do so, they used the Keck 1 telescope at the W. M. Keck Observatory in Hawaii; the Shane and Hale telescopes in California; telescopes at the WIYN (including MMT) and Whipple observatories in Arizona; Nordic Optical Telescope in the Canary Islands; the Hobby-Eberly and Harlan J. Smith telescopes in Texas; and NASA's Spitzer Space Telescope. Because Kepler-11g orbits its star at a far greater distance than the inner five planets, fewer transits were observed, and radial velocity (the observation of a Doppler effect) interactions could not be easily discerned. As with the discovery of Kepler-9d, the Kepler team ran the information through numerous models to see if Kepler-11g's light curve could fit the profile of some other object, including an eclipsing binary star in the background that may have contaminated the data. The probability that Kepler-11g is not a planet but instead a false positive was determined to be 0.18%, effectively confirming its existence.

Kepler-11g, along with its five sister planets, were announced at a NASA press conference on February 2, 2011. The findings were published in the journal Nature a day later.

== Host star ==
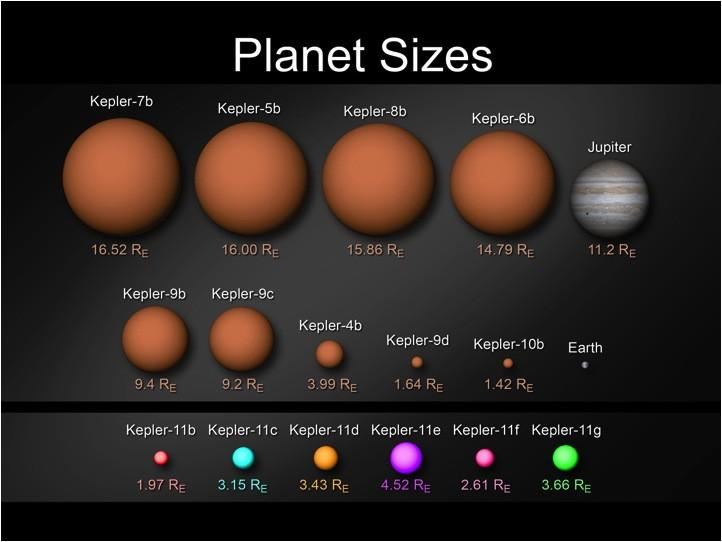
A comparison of the Kepler planets as compared to Earth, Jupiter, and previous Kepler finds. Kepler-11g is in green at the bottom right.

Kepler-11 is a star in the constellation Cygnus. It is located approximately 659 parsecs away.Kepler-11 has an apparent magnitude of 14.2, and thus cannot be seen with the naked eye.

== Characteristics ==
Kepler-11g, the sixth planet of six from its star, its mass is estimated to be at most 25 times that of Earth. Its exact mass could not be determined through transit observations because, while gravitational interactions of Kepler-11's five inner planets were used to determine their masses, Kepler-11g's comparatively large distance prevented it from affecting, or being affected by, the other five planets. As a result, only an upper limit can be placed on the mass, which is based on the fact that if it were above this limit, gravitational effects on the other planets would be observed. Nonetheless, tighter constraints were placed on Kepler-11g's mass by formation and evolution calculations, which indicated that the planet mass is not much greater than about 7 M_{E}.

Its radius was measured to be 3.33 times that of Earth, somewhat smaller than Neptune's radius. According to formation models, the planet has a gaseous envelope of light elements comprising about 10% of its mass. Kepler-11g has an estimated surface equilibrium temperature of 400 K, over 1.5 times (50% higher) that of Earth's equilibrium temperature. Kepler-11g orbits Kepler-11 every 118.37774 days (over 2.5 times that of the fifth planet from Kepler-11, Kepler-11f) at a distance of 0.462 AU, almost half of the distance from which Earth orbits the Sun. Its eccentricity is unknown. In comparison, planet Mercury orbits the Sun every 87.97 days at a distance of 0.387 AU. With an orbital inclination of 89.8°, Kepler-11g is seen almost edge-on with respect to Earth.

Temperature comparisons	Venus	Earth	Kepler-11g	Mars
Global; Equilibrium; Temperature	307 K 34 °C; 93 °F	255 K −18 °C −0.4 °F	400 K 127 °C; 260.6 °F	206 K −67 °C −88.6 °F
+ Venus'; GHG effect	737 K 464 °C; 867 °F			
+ Earth's; GHG effect		288 K 15 °C; 59 °F		
+ Mars'; GHG effect				210 K −63 °C −81 °F
Tidally locked	Almost	No	unknown	No
Global; Bond Albedo	0.9	0.29	unknown	0.25
Refs.
