= Harlan J. Smith Telescope =

Telescope located at the University of Texas at Austin observatory

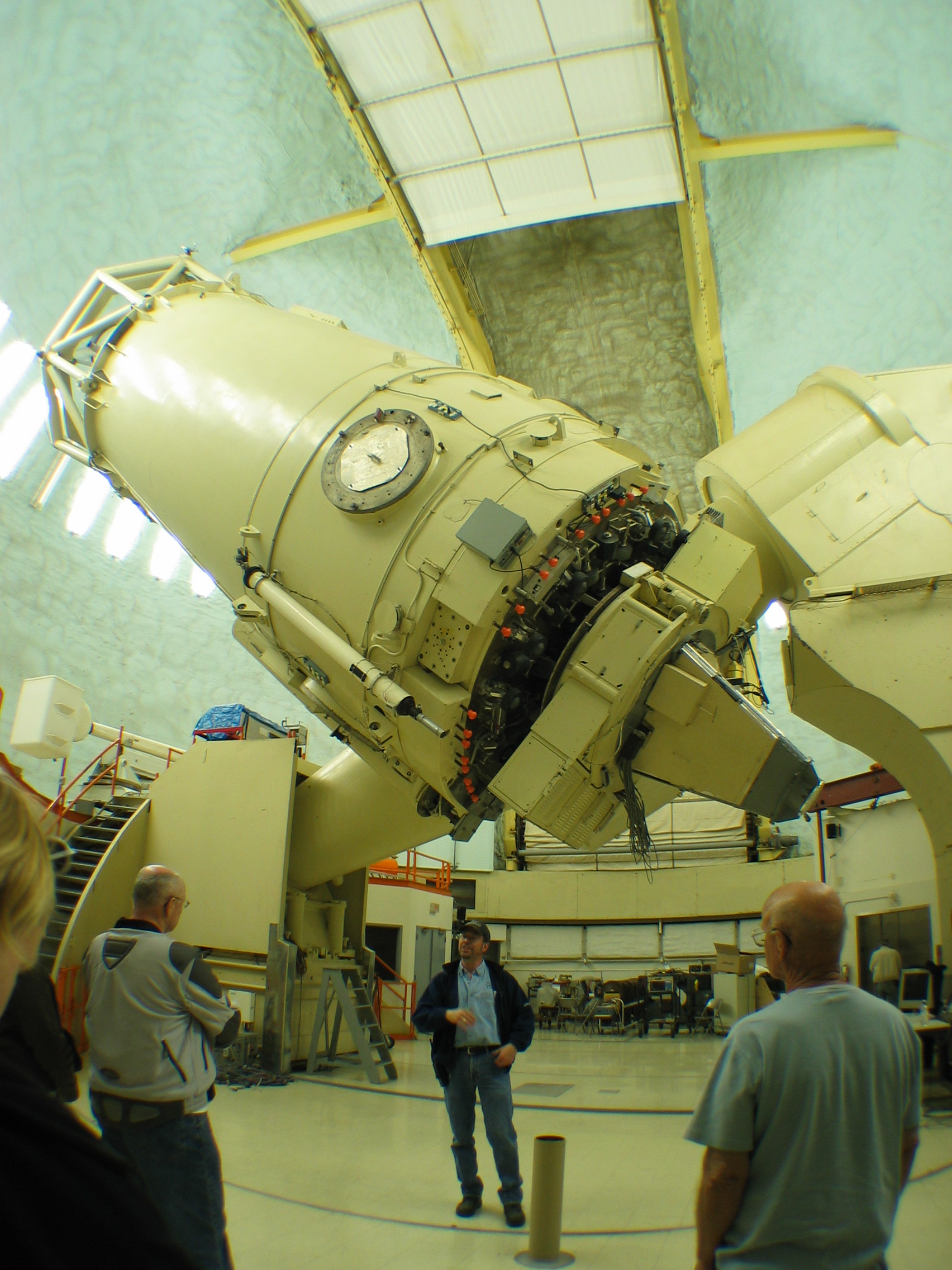
- Alternative names: 2.7m Harlan J Smith Telescope
- Location: Jeff Davis County, Texas
- Coordinates: 30°40′18″N 104°01′19″W
- Diameter: 107 in (2.7 m)
- Website: mcdonaldobservatory.org/research/telescopes/HJSmith
- Location within the United States
- Related media on Commons

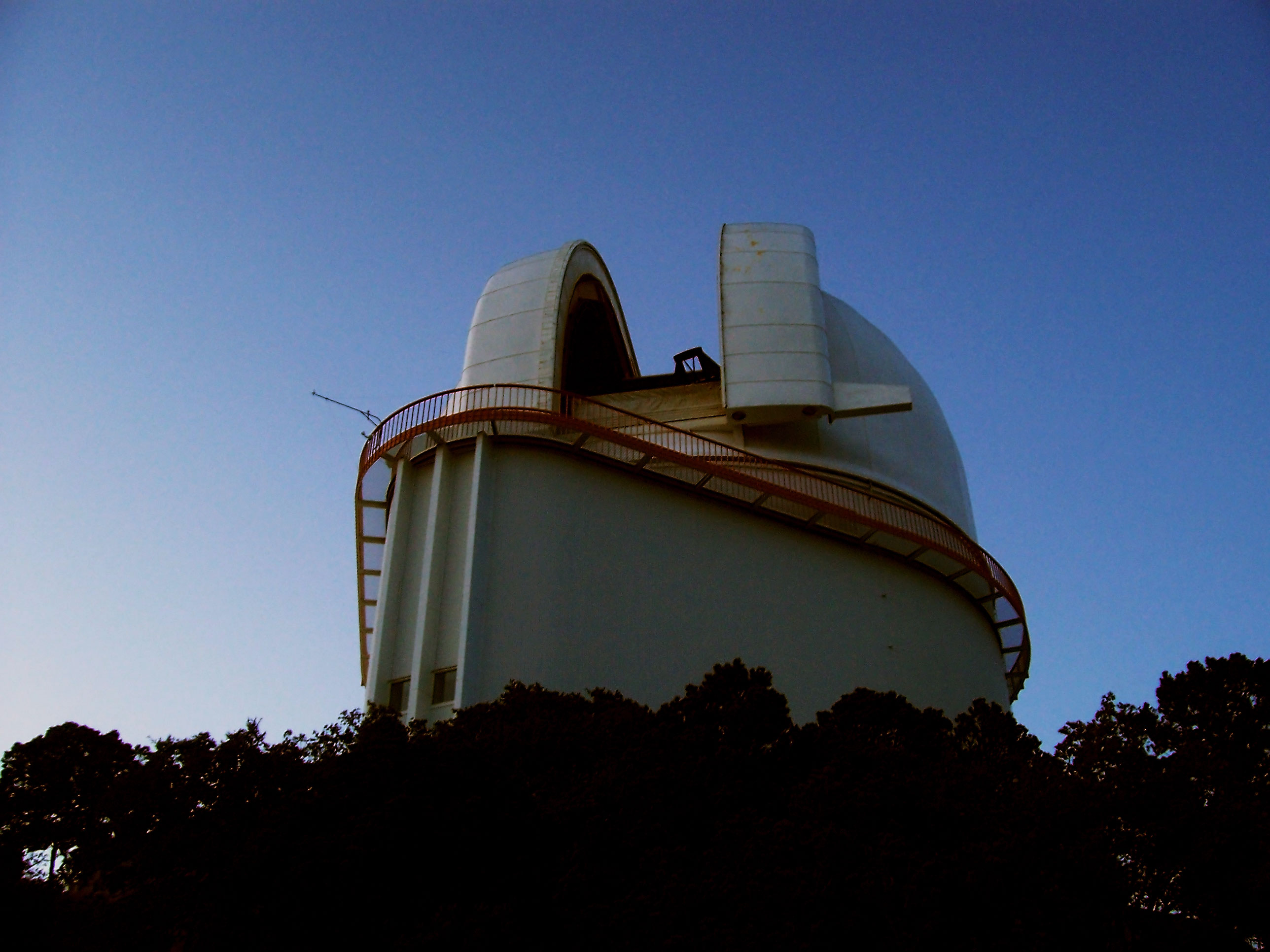
Dome at dusk

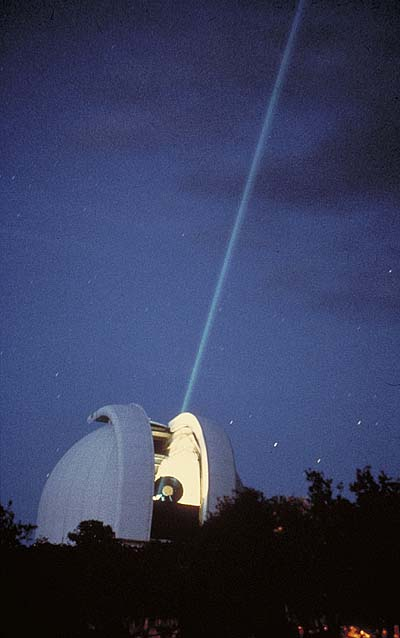
The 2.7-meter Harlan J. Smith Telescope of the McDonald Observatory (US) is used to point a laser beam to a reflector stationed on the surface of the Moon.

The Harlan J. Smith Telescope is a 107-inch (2.7 m) telescope located at the McDonald Observatory, in Texas, in the United States. This telescope is one of several research telescopes that are part of the University of Texas at Austin observatory perched on Mount Locke in the Davis Mountains of west Texas. The telescope was completed in 1968 with substantial NASA assistance, and is named after Harlan James Smith, the first Texas director of McDonald Observatory. Smith was the Observatory Director for 26 years.

== Vandalism damage ==
The telescope was the victim of an act of vandalism in February 1970. A newly hired worker suffered a mental breakdown and brought a hand gun into the observatory. After firing one shot at his supervisor, the worker then fired the remaining rounds into the Primary Mirror. The holes effectively reduced the 107-inch (2.7 m) telescope to the equivalent of a 106-inch telescope (or about 2.5 centimeters less), but did not affect the quality of the telescope's images, only the amount of light it can collect.

== Observations ==
The telescope has been used to observe many things. Some achievements includes the stars BD+17°3248 and XO-1.

Jorge Meléndez of the Australian National University and Iván Ramírez of the University of Texas at Austin used the telescope to discover that star HIP 56948 is a near twin of the Sun, based on a comparison of their chemical element abundances.

The Visible Integral-field Replicable Unit Spectrograph-W (VIRUS-W), an integral field spectrograph, was used in 2021 to find that the Leo 1 dwarf galaxy contains a supermassive black hole.

== Contemporaries on commissioning ==
Four largest telescopes 1968:

#	Name / Observatory	Image	Aperture	Altitude	First Light	Special advocate
1	Hale Telescope; Palomar Observatory		200 inch 508 cm	1713 m (5620 ft)	1949	Edwin Hubble
2	C. Donald Shane telescope Lick Observatory		120 inch 305 cm	1283 m (4209 ft)	1959	Nicholas U. Mayall; C. Donald Shane
3	Harlan J. Smith Telescope; McDonald Observatory		107 in 270 cm	2070 m (6791 ft)	1968	Harlan J. Smith
4	Shajn 2.6 m (Crimean 102 inch); Crimean Astrophysical Observatory		102 in 260 cm	600 m (1969 ft)	1961	

== See also ==
- List of largest optical reflecting telescopes
