= Hobby–Eberly Telescope =

10-meter-aperture telescope in Texas, USA

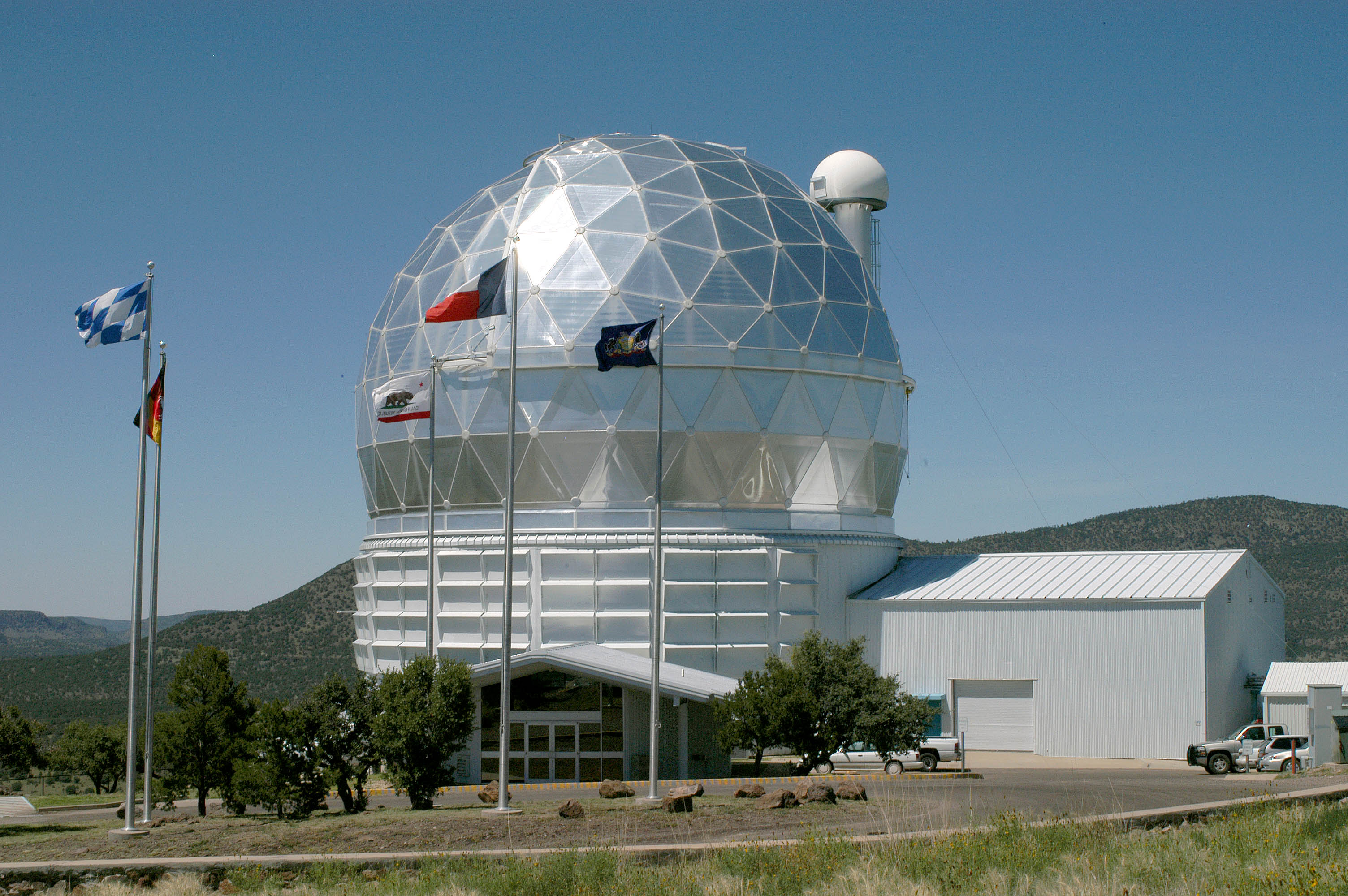
- Hobby–Eberly Telescope at McDonald Observatory October 28, 2006
- Alternative names: HET
- Location: Jeff Davis County, Texas
- Coordinates: 30°40′53″N 104°00′53″W
- Altitude: 2,030 m (6,660 ft)
- Wavelength: 350 nm (860 THz)–1,800 nm (170 THz)
- Diameter: 10 m (32 ft 10 in)
- Secondary diameter: 1 m (3 ft 3 in)
- Tertiary diameter: 1 m (3 ft 3 in)
- Collecting area: 78.5 m^{2} (845 sq ft)
- Focal length: 13.08 m (42 ft 11 in)
- Website: mcdonaldobservatory.org/research/telescopes/HET
- Location within the United States
- Related media on Commons

Comparison of nominal sizes of apertures of the Hobby–Eberly Telescope and some notable optical telescopes

The Hobby–Eberly Telescope (HET) is a 10-meter-aperture (33 ft) telescope located at the McDonald Observatory in Davis Mountains, Texas.

The Hobby–Eberly Telescope is one of the largest optical telescopes in the world. It combines a number of features that differentiate it from most telescope designs, resulting in lowered construction costs:

- The telescope's main mirror is fixed at a 55° angle and can only rotate around its base. A target is tracked by moving the instruments at the focus of the telescope; this provides access to about 70–81% of the sky at its location and allows a single target to be tracked for up to two hours.
- The primary mirror is constructed from 91 hexagonal segments, which is less expensive than manufacturing a single large primary.

The telescope is named for former Texas Lieutenant-Governor Bill Hobby and for Robert E. Eberly, a Penn State benefactor.

Three instruments are available to analyze the light from the targets. All three instruments are spectrographs. The instruments work at high, medium and low spectral resolution. The low-resolution spectrograph is housed at the prime focus, while the medium and high-resolution spectrographs reside in the basement and the light is fed into them via a fiber-optic cable.

Since achieving first light in 1996, the telescope has been used for a wide variety of studies ranging from the Solar System to stars in our galaxy and studies of other galaxies. The telescope has been used successfully to find planets orbiting around other stars by measuring radial velocities as precisely as 1 m/s. Using the low-resolution spectrograph, the telescope has been used to identify Type Ia supernovae to measure the acceleration of the universe. The telescope has also been used to measure the rotation of individual galaxies. The telescope was upgraded for use in the Hobby–Eberly Telescope Dark Energy Experiment (HETDEX), which will provide the first observations to allow narrowing of the list of possible explanations for dark energy. Along with the new Visible Integral-Field Replicable Unit Spectrograph (VIRUS) to enable observations for the HETDEX project with 192 spectrographs.

The Hobby–Eberly Telescope is operated by The University of Texas McDonald Observatory for a consortium of institutions which includes The University of Texas at Austin, Pennsylvania State University, LMU Munich, and Georg August University of Göttingen.

The physical main reflector mirror is larger than 10 meters; it is actually about 11 m by 9.8 m. Upon first light, the usable optical aperture at any given time was 9.2 m. After a multi-year upgrade completed on July 29, 2015, the usable optical aperture was increased to 10m. The mirror itself is composed of 91 hexagonal segments, a segmented mirror design like the Keck telescopes. Updates to the telescope have increased its field of view from 4 arcminutes to 22 arcminutes (a full moon is 30 arcminutes for comparison). The telescope mirrors are aligned within a fraction of a wavelength of visible light by actuators under each segment. The tower next to the telescope, called the Center of Curvature Alignment Sensor Tower (CCAS), is used to calibrate the mirror segments. One of the advantages of this telescope design is that it was over 5 times more cost efficient for its aperture size than a more traditional design.

As reported in Nature of 28 November 2012, astronomers have used the Hobby–Eberly Telescope to measure the mass of an extraordinarily large black hole (with mass approximates 17 billion Suns), possibly the largest black hole found so far. It has been found in the compact, lenticular galaxy NGC 1277, which lies 220 million light-years away in the constellation Perseus. The black hole has approximately 59 percent of the mass of the bulge of this spiral galaxy (14 percent of the total stellar mass of the galaxy).

The Habitable Zone Planet Finder is a spectrograph for the Hobby–Eberly Telescope capable of detecting earth like planets.

The design of the Hobby–Eberly was used as the basis for the Southern African Large Telescope.

== See also ==
- List of largest optical reflecting telescopes
- Southern African Large Telescope
- List of the largest optical telescopes in the contiguous United States
- List of largest optical telescopes in the 20th century
