= C. Donald Shane telescope =

120-inch reflecting telescope

C. Donald Shane Telescope
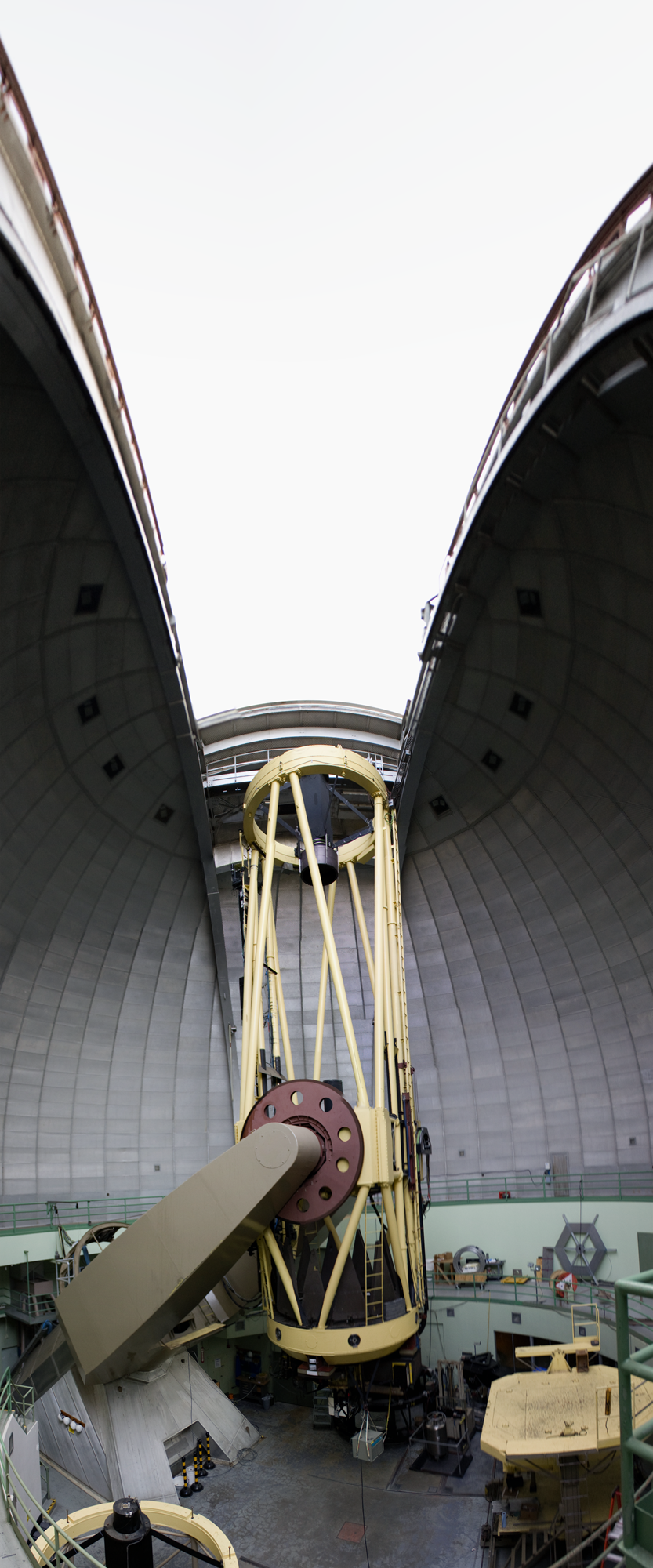
- C. Donald Shane 3m telescope at the Lick observatory on Mt. Hamilton, San Jose, California - as seen from inside the dome.
- Alternative names: C. Donald Shane telescope
- Location: Santa Clara County, California, Pacific States Region
- Coordinates: 37°20′35″N 121°38′14″W
- First light: 1959
- Website: www.ucolick.org/public/telescopes/shane.html,%20https://www.ucolick.org/main/science/telescopes/shane.html
- Location within the United States
- Related media on Commons

The C. Donald Shane telescope is a 120-inch (3.05-meter) reflecting telescope located at the Lick Observatory in Mount Hamilton, California. It was named after astronomer C. Donald Shane in 1978, who led the effort to acquire the necessary funds from the California Legislature, and who then oversaw the telescope's construction. It is the largest and most powerful telescope at the Lick Observatory, and was the second-largest optical telescope in the world when it was commissioned in 1959.

The Shane's mirror started as a 10,000-pound Corning Labs glass test blank for the Palomar Observatory's 200-inch (5-m) Hale Telescope (in north San Diego County, California), but was sold below cost ($50,000) by Caltech to the Lick Observatory. It was then transported to Mount Hamilton, where the blank was ground and polished by the observatory.

The telescope is noted for having three foci, prime focus, Cassegrain focus, and coudé focus. After several decades of celebrated use, it was also fitted with an early adaptive optics system.

== Features ==
The telescope can be used with three different focal stations: wide field prime focus, coudé focus for high precision spectroscopy, or the intermediate cassegrain focus.

In the Shane dome there is a laser, whose light is sometimes visible with the naked eye, that the observatory beams from the Shane telescope into the night sky. The laser is part of the Lick Adaptive Optics (LAO) program, a joint project of the Lick Observatory and the Lawrence Livermore National Laboratory. LAO corrects for atmospheric turbulence either by using a natural guide star or by creating a sodium laser guide star, and using the observed motion of the guide star to direct distortion of a deformable mirror hundreds of times each second. The system produces images that are nearly equivalent to those obtained from space-based telescopes. Adaptive optics using natural guide stars has been in development since 1996, and using laser guide stars since 2001. Similar laser adaptive optics systems based on LAO have been installed on the University of California's two Keck telescopes in Hawaii.

Operation of the Kast instrument began in 1992, and it was upgraded in the 2010s. The Kast Double Spectrograph can detect spectrum from near-infrared to near-ultraviolet, and includes two sub-instruments.

Instrumentation currently in operation at the Shane telescope includes:

- The Kast Double Spectrograph, used for visible wavelength observations of stars, supernovae, galaxies, and active galactic nuclei
- The Hamilton Spectrograph, an echelle spectrograph used for stellar spectroscopy and detection of exoplanets
- The Shane Adaptive optics infra-Red Camera Spectrograph (ShARCS), an infrared camera used with the Shane adaptive optics system

== History ==
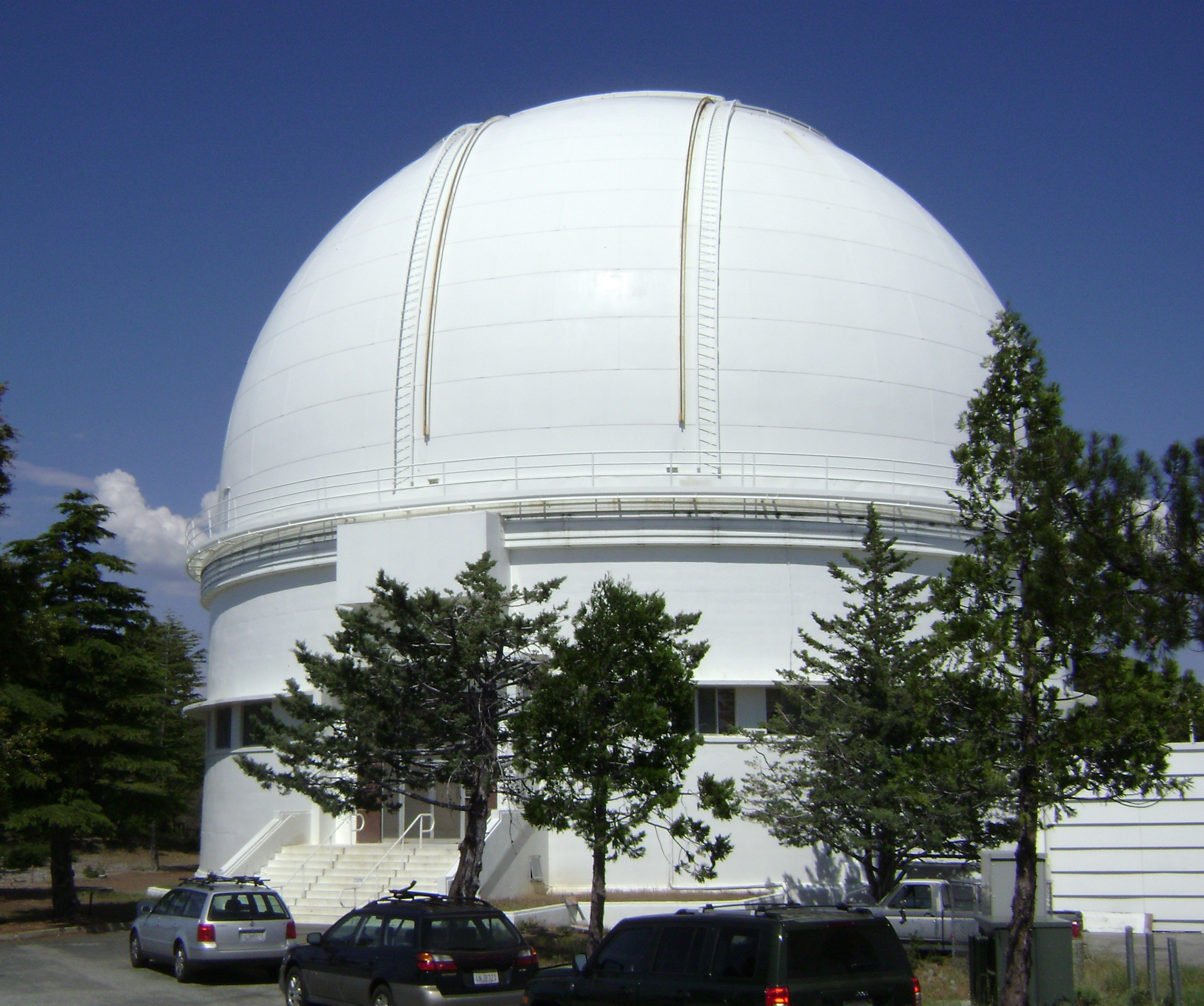
The dome housing the Shane telescope

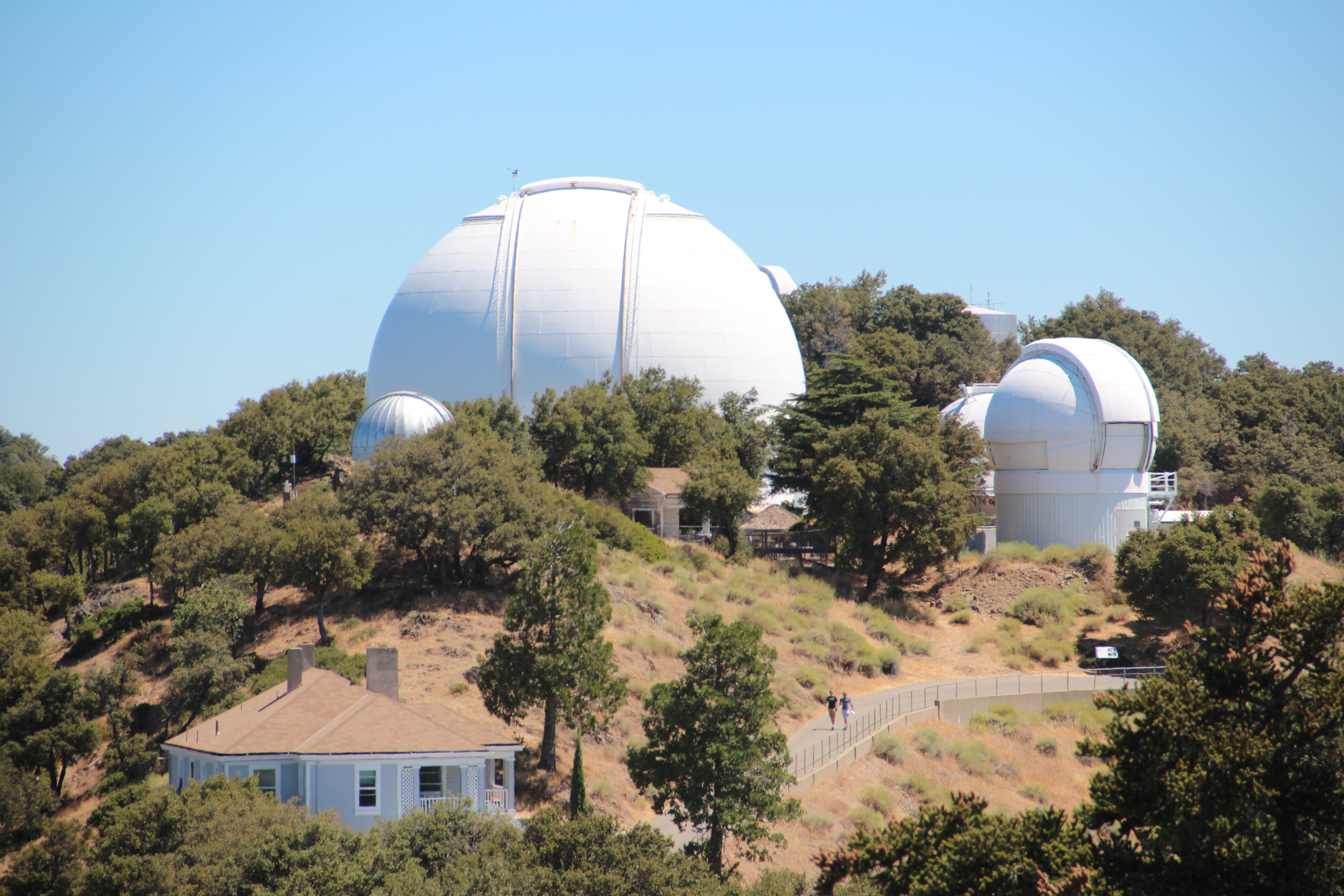
Shane dome among the mountain top facilitates

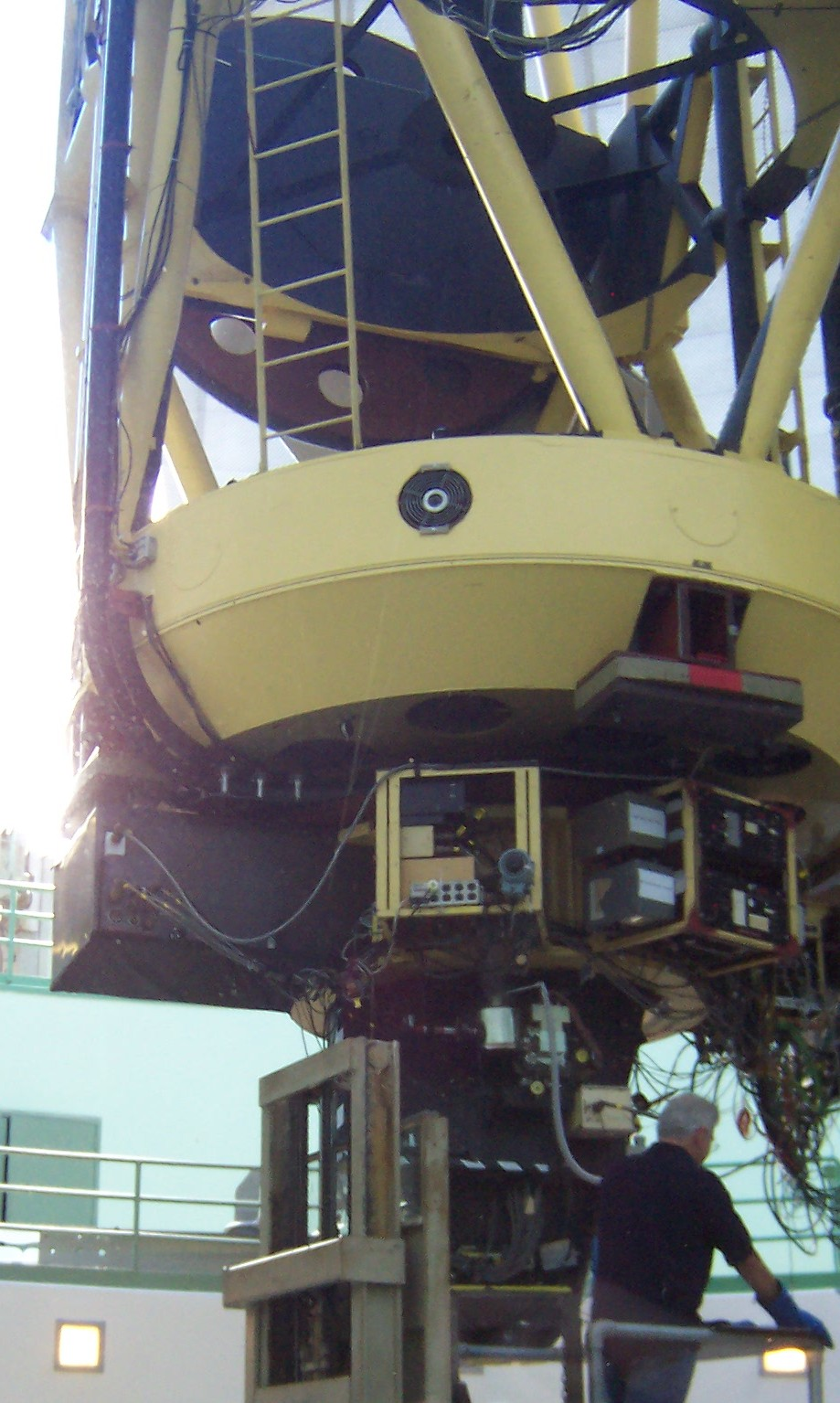
Detail of lower truss

After WW2 ended, plans for a large reflecting telescope for the Lick observatory were realized by funding from the State of California in 1946. A 120 inch glass blank leftover from the Hale telescope was acquired, and ground to its figure at optical shops on the mountain.

For Lick Observatory's first 55 years of operation, its astronomers relied on two telescopes built in the 19th century. Once considered giants in the field, they had become obsolete. International competition was mounting. The 120-inch reflector addition took 15 years to complete, being completed in 1959. It would be the second-largest telescope in the world, taking its place behind the then World's largest 200-inch Palomar Hale Telescope.

An adaptive optics system for the Shane was developed, utilizing an artificial star made by laser and a deformable mirror with actuators. This AO system was mounted at the f/17 cassegrain focus of the Shane telescope. The system could send light to a visible-light CCD or an infrared sensor (NICMOS III camera).

The Shane telescope was tested in 1995 with a sodium laser to make an artificial light for the AO system; the laser utilizes a layer in the atmosphere that reacts with the light.

In 2009, the Lick Observatory celebrated the fiftieth anniversary of the Shane telescope. The celebration included a ticketed event with a dinner and a lecture on exoplanets by an astronomer. In 2014, the observatory received a grant to upgrade the Kast instrument of the Shane telescope.

In 2015, the company Google donated 1 million USD to the observatory over two years.

== Contemporaries on commissioning ==
The Shane telescope saw first light to a different world for large telescopes in 1959:

#	Name / Observatory	Image	Aperture	Altitude	First Light	Special advocate
1	Hale Telescope; Palomar Obs.		200 inch 508 cm	1713 m (5620 ft)	1948	George Ellery Hale; John D. Rockefeller
2	Shane Telescope; Lick Observatory		120 inch 305 cm	1283 m (4209 ft)	1959	Nicholas Mayall; C. Donald Shane
3	Hooker Telescope; Mount Wilson Obs.		100 inch 254 cm	1742 m (5715 ft)	1917	George Ellery Hale; Andrew Carnegie
4	Otto Struve Telescope; McDonald Obs.		82 inch 210 cm	2,070 m 6791 ft	1939	Otto Struve

== See also ==
- List of largest optical reflecting telescopes
- List of largest optical telescopes in the 20th century
