= Lidar =

Method of spatial measurement using laser

Lidar (/ˈlaɪdɑːr/, an acronym of light detection and ranging or laser imaging, detection, and ranging, often stylized LiDAR) is a method for determining ranges by targeting an object or a surface with a laser and measuring the time for the reflected light to return to the optical receiver. Lidar may operate in a fixed direction (e.g., vertical) or it may scan directions, in a special combination of 3D scanning and laser scanning.

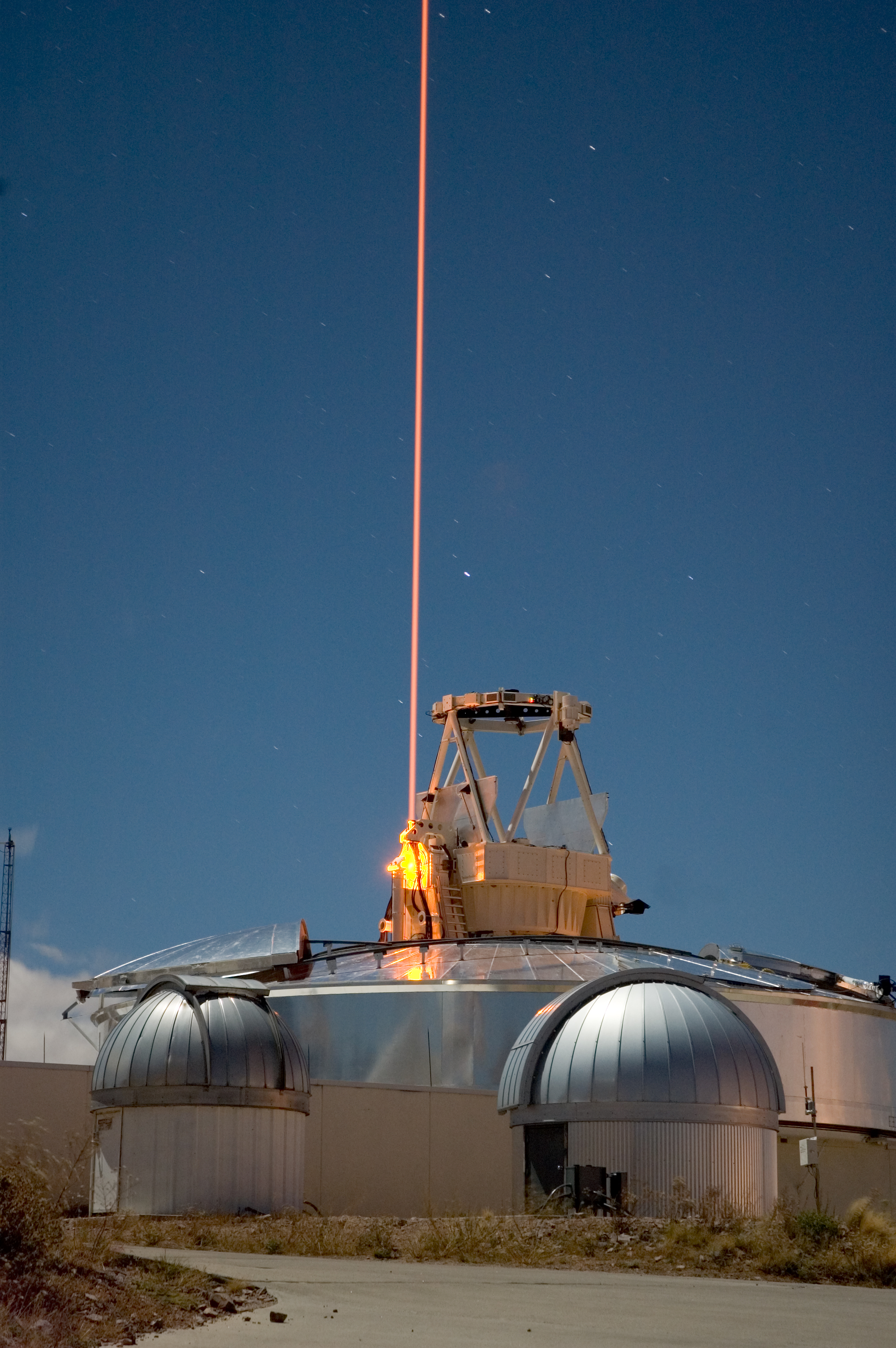
A frequency addition source of optical radiation (FASOR) used at the Starfire Optical Range for lidar and laser guide star experiments is tuned to the sodium D2a line and used to excite sodium atoms in the upper atmosphere.

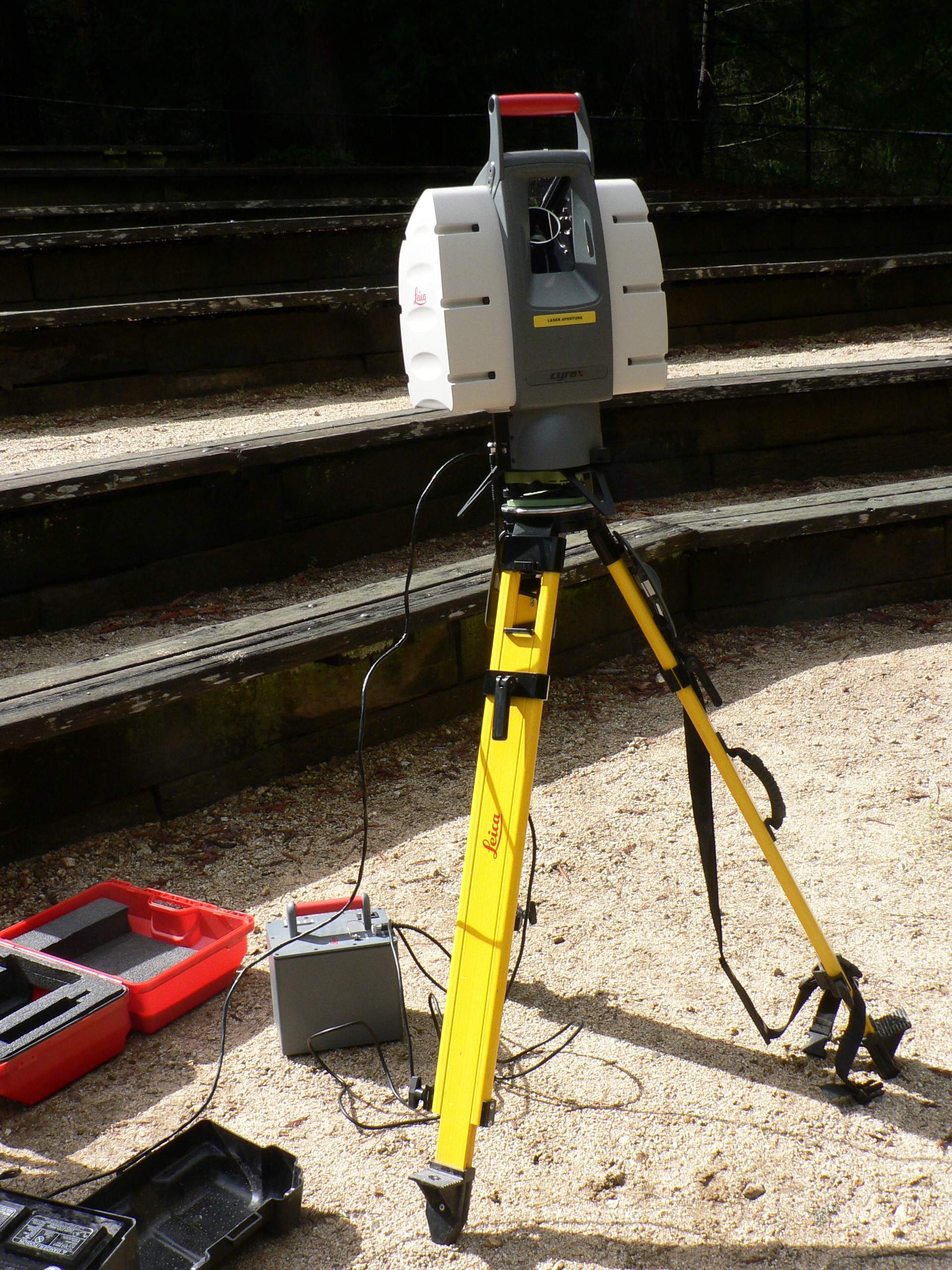
This lidar may be used to scan buildings, rock formations, et cetera, to produce a 3D model. The lidar can aim its laser beam in a wide range: its head rotates horizontally; a mirror tilts vertically. The laser beam is used to measure the distance to the first object on its path.

LiDAR is used within terrestrial, airborne, and mobile equipment around the globe. It is commonly used to make high-resolution maps, with uses in surveying, geodesy, geomatics, archaeology, geography, geology, geomorphology, seismology, forestry, atmospheric physics, and laser guidance. It is used to make digital 3D representations of areas on the Earth's surface and ocean bottom of the intertidal and near coastal zone by varying the wavelength of light. It has also been increasingly used in control and navigation for autonomous cars and for the helicopter Ingenuity on its record-setting flights over the terrain of Mars. Lidar has since been used extensively for atmospheric research and meteorology. Lidar instruments fitted to aircraft and satellites carry out surveying and mapping – a recent example being the U.S. Geological Survey Experimental Advanced Airborne Research Lidar. NASA has identified lidar as a key technology for enabling autonomous precision safe landing of future robotic and crewed lunar-landing vehicles.

== History and etymology ==
The essential concept of lidar was originated by E. H. Synge in 1930, who envisaged the use of powerful searchlights to probe the atmosphere.

Under the direction of Malcolm Stitch, the Hughes Aircraft Company introduced the first lidar-like system in 1961, shortly after the invention of the laser. Intended for satellite tracking, this system combined laser-focused imaging with the ability to calculate distances by measuring the time for a signal to return using appropriate sensors and data acquisition electronics. It was originally called "Colidar" an acronym for "coherent light detecting and ranging", derived from the term "radar", itself an acronym for "radio detection and ranging". All laser rangefinders, laser altimeters and lidar units are derived from the early colidar systems.

The first practical terrestrial application of a colidar system was the "Colidar Mark II", a large rifle-like laser rangefinder produced in 1963, which had a range of 11 km and an accuracy of 4.5 m, to be used for military targeting. The first mention of lidar as a stand-alone word in 1963 suggests that it originated as a portmanteau of "light" and "radar": "Eventually the laser may provide an extremely sensitive detector of particular wavelengths from distant objects. Meanwhile, it is being used to study the Moon by 'lidar' (light radar) ..." The name "photonic radar" is sometimes used to mean visible-spectrum range finding like lidar.

Lidar's first applications were in meteorology, for which the National Center for Atmospheric Research used it to measure clouds and pollution. The general public became aware of the accuracy and usefulness of lidar systems in 1971 during the Apollo 15 mission, when astronauts used a laser altimeter to map the surface of the Moon. Although the English language no longer treats "radar" as an acronym, (i.e., uncapitalized), the word "lidar" was capitalized as "LIDAR" or "LiDAR" in some publications beginning in the 1980s. No consensus exists on capitalization. Various publications refer to lidar as "LIDAR", "LiDAR", "LIDaR", or "Lidar". The USGS uses both "LIDAR" and "lidar", sometimes in the same document; the New York Times predominantly uses "lidar" for staff-written articles, although contributing news feeds such as Reuters may use Lidar.

== Principles ==
Basic time-of-flight principles applied to laser range-finding

Lidar uses ultraviolet, visible, or near infrared light to image objects. It can target a wide range of materials, including non-metallic objects, rocks, rain, chemical compounds, aerosols, clouds and even single molecules. A narrow laser beam can map physical features with very high resolutions; for example, an aircraft can map terrain at 30-centimetre (12 in) resolution or better.

Wavelengths vary to suit the target: from about 10 micrometers (infrared) to approximately 250 nanometers (ultraviolet). Typically, light is reflected via backscattering, as opposed to pure reflection one might find with a mirror. Different types of scattering are used for different lidar applications: most commonly Rayleigh scattering, Mie scattering, Raman scattering, and fluorescence. Suitable combinations of wavelengths can allow remote mapping of atmospheric contents by identifying wavelength-dependent changes in the intensity of the returned signal. The name "photonic radar" is sometimes used to mean visible-spectrum range finding like lidar, although photonic radar more strictly refers to radio-frequency range finding using photonics components.

A lidar determines the distance of an object or a surface with the formula:

$$d=\frac{c\cdot t}{2}$$

where c is the speed of light, d is the distance between the detector and the object or surface being detected, and t is the time spent for the laser light to travel to the object or surface being detected, then travel back to the detector.

The two kinds of lidar detection schemes are "incoherent" or direct energy detection (which principally measures amplitude changes of the reflected light) and coherent detection (best for measuring Doppler shifts, or changes in the phase of the reflected light). Coherent systems generally use optical heterodyne detection. This is more sensitive than direct detection and allows them to operate at much lower power, but requires more complex transceivers.

Both types employ pulse models: either micropulse or high energy. Micropulse systems utilize intermittent bursts of energy. They developed as a result of ever-increasing computer power, combined with advances in laser technology. They use considerably less energy in the laser, typically on the order of one microjoule, and are often "eye-safe", meaning they can be used without safety precautions. High-power systems are common in atmospheric research, where they are widely used for measuring atmospheric parameters: the height, layering and densities of clouds, cloud particle properties (extinction coefficient, backscatter coefficient, depolarization), temperature, pressure, wind, humidity, and trace gas concentration (ozone, methane, nitrous oxide, etc.).

== Components ==
A basic lidar system involves a laser range finder reflected by a rotating mirror (top). The laser is scanned around the scene being digitized, in one or two dimensions (middle), gathering distance measurements at specified angle intervals (bottom).

=== Laser ===
600–1,000 nm lasers are most common for non-scientific applications. The maximum power of the laser is limited, or an automatic shut-off system which turns the laser off at specific altitudes is used in order to make it eye-safe for the people on the ground.

One common alternative, 1,550 nm lasers, are eye-safe at relatively high power levels since this wavelength is strongly absorbed by water and barely reaches the retina, though camera sensors can still get damaged. A trade-off though is that current detector technology is less advanced, so these wavelengths are generally used at longer ranges with lower accuracies. They are also used for military applications because 1,550 nm is not visible in night vision goggles, unlike the shorter 1,000 nm infrared laser.

Airborne topographic mapping lidars generally use 1,064 nm diode-pumped YAG lasers, while bathymetric (underwater depth research) systems generally use 532 nm frequency-doubled diode pumped YAG lasers because 532 nm penetrates water with much less attenuation than 1,064 nm. Laser settings include the laser repetition rate (which controls the data collection speed). Pulse length is generally an attribute of the laser cavity length, the number of passes required through the gain material (YAG, YLF, etc.), and Q-switch (pulsing) speed. Better target resolution is achieved with shorter pulses, provided the lidar receiver detectors and electronics have sufficient bandwidth.

Microelectromechanical mirrors (MEMS) are not entirely solid-state. However, their tiny form factor provides many of the same cost benefits. A single laser is directed to a single mirror that can be reoriented to view any part of the target field. The mirror spins at a rapid rate. However, MEMS systems generally operate in a single plane (left to right). To add a second dimension generally requires a second mirror that moves up and down. Alternatively, another laser can hit the same mirror from another angle. MEMS systems can be disrupted by shock/vibration and may require repeated calibration.

=== Scanner and optics ===
Image development speed is affected by the speed at which they are scanned. Options to scan the azimuth and elevation include dual oscillating plane mirrors, a combination with a polygon mirror, and a dual axis scanner. Optic choices affect the angular resolution and range that can be detected. A hole mirror or a beam splitter are options to collect a return signal.

=== Photodetector and receiver electronics ===
Two main photodetector technologies are used in lidar: solid-state photodetectors, such as silicon avalanche photodiodes, or photomultipliers. The sensitivity of the receiver is another parameter that has to be balanced in a lidar design.

=== Position and navigation systems ===
Lidar sensors mounted on mobile platforms such as airplanes or satellites require instrumentation to determine the absolute position and orientation of the sensor. Such devices generally include a Global Positioning System receiver and an inertial measurement unit (IMU).

=== Sensor ===
Lidar uses active sensors that supply their own illumination source. The energy source hits objects and the reflected energy is detected and measured by sensors. Distance to the object is determined by recording the time between transmitted and backscattered pulses and by using the speed of light to calculate the distance traveled. Flash lidar allows for 3D imaging because of the camera's ability to emit a larger flash and sense the spatial relationships and dimensions of area of interest with the returned energy. This allows for more accurate imaging because the captured frames do not need to be stitched together, and the system is not sensitive to platform motion. This results in less distortion.

3D imaging can be achieved using both scanning and non-scanning systems. "3D gated viewing laser radar" is a non-scanning laser ranging system that applies a pulsed laser and a fast gated camera. Research has begun for virtual beam steering using digital light processing (DLP) technology.

Imaging lidar can also be performed using arrays of high speed detectors and modulation sensitive detector arrays typically built on single chips using complementary metal–oxide–semiconductor (CMOS) and hybrid CMOS/charge-coupled device (CCD) fabrication techniques. In these devices each pixel performs some local processing such as demodulation or gating at high speed, downconverting the signals to video rate so that the array can be read like a camera. Using this technique many thousands of pixels / channels may be acquired simultaneously. High resolution 3D lidar cameras use homodyne detection with an electronic CCD or CMOS shutter.

A coherent imaging lidar uses synthetic array heterodyne detection to enable a staring single element receiver to act as though it were an imaging array.

== Platform ==
A lidar platform can be oriented to nadir, zenith, or laterally. For example, lidar altimeters look down, an atmospheric lidar looks up, and lidar-based collision avoidance systems are side-looking.

Laser projections of lidars can be manipulated using various methods and mechanisms to produce a scanning effect: the standard spindle-type, which spins to give a 360-degree view; solid-state lidar, which has a fixed field of view, but no moving parts, and can use either MEMS or optical phased arrays to steer the beams; and flash lidar, which spreads a flash of light over a large field of view before the signal bounces back to a detector.

Animation of a satellite collecting digital elevation map data over the Ganges and Brahmaputra River basin using lidar

Lidar operation can be divided into airborne and terrestrial types. The two types require scanners with varying specifications based on the data's purpose, the size of the area to be captured, the range of measurement desired, the cost of equipment, and more. Spaceborne platforms are also possible, using satellite laser altimetry.

Airborne lidar (also airborne laser scanning) is when a laser scanner, while attached to an aircraft during flight, creates a 3D point cloud model of the landscape. This is currently the most detailed and accurate method of creating digital elevation models, replacing photogrammetry. One major advantage in comparison with photogrammetry is the ability to filter out reflections from vegetation from the point cloud model to create a digital terrain model which represents ground surfaces such as rivers, paths, cultural heritage sites, etc., which are concealed by trees. Within the category of airborne lidar, there is sometimes a distinction made between high-altitude and low-altitude applications, but the main difference is a reduction in both accuracy and point density of data acquired at higher altitudes.

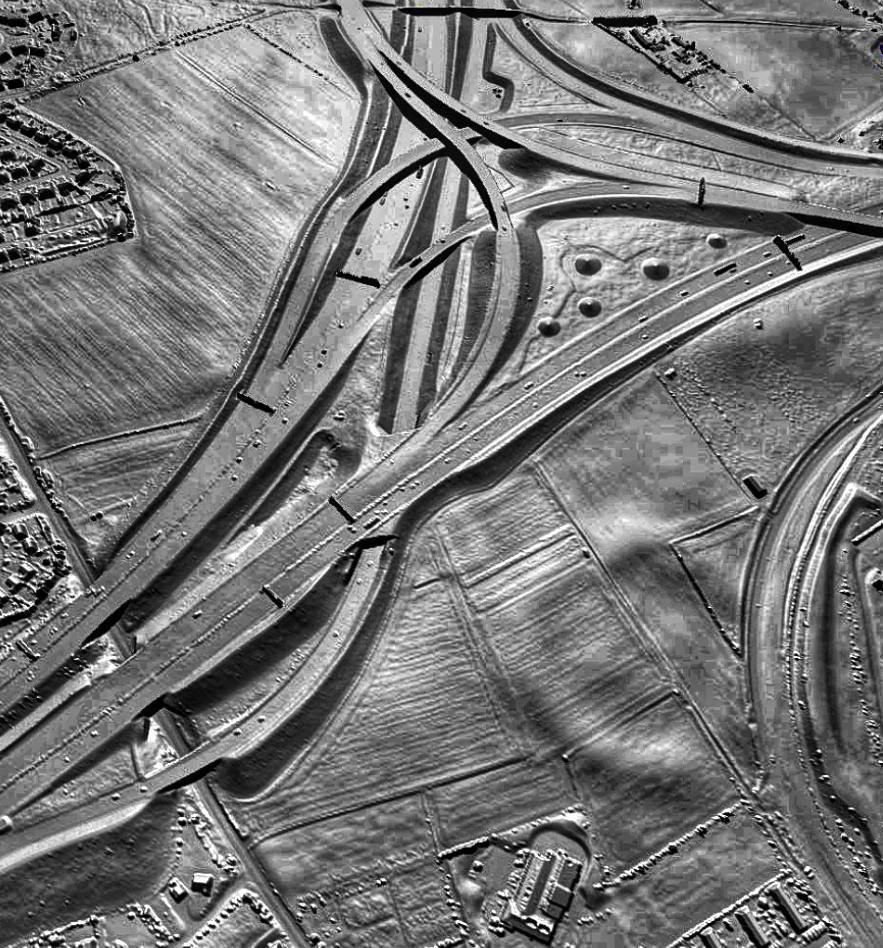
A DSM lidar view of Ferrybridge Henge (bottom right) and the surrounding roads and area in West Yorkshire

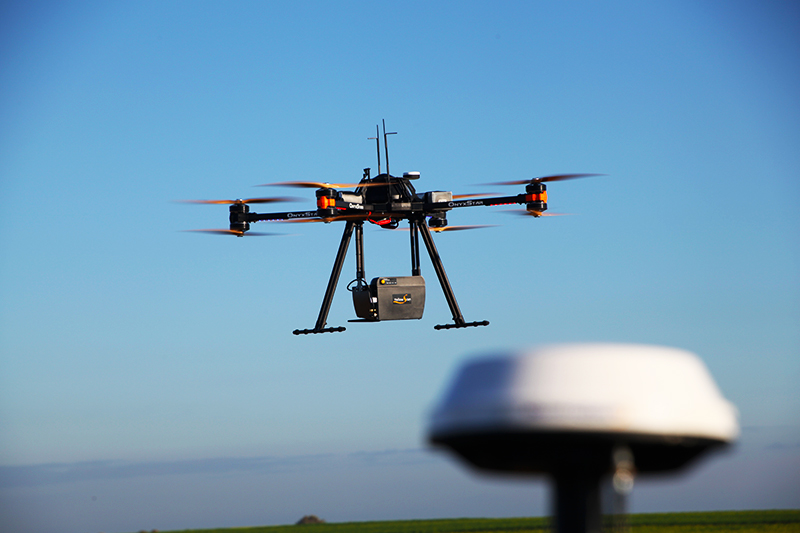
Lidar scanning performed with a multicopter UAV

Multiple commercial lidar systems for unmanned aerial vehicles are currently on the market. These platforms can systematically scan large areas, or provide a cheaper alternative to manned aircraft for smaller scanning operations.

Terrestrial lidar platforms (also terrestrial laser scanning) happen on the Earth's surface and can be either stationary or mobile. Stationary terrestrial scanning is most common as a survey method, for example in conventional topography, monitoring, cultural heritage documentation and forensics. The 3D point clouds acquired from these types of scanners can be matched with digital images taken of the scanned area from the scanner's location to create realistic looking 3D models in a relatively short time when compared to other technologies. Each point in the point cloud is given the colour of the pixel from the image taken at the same location and direction as the laser beam that created the point.

Terrestrial lidar mapping involves a process of occupancy grid map generation. The process involves an array of cells divided into grids which employ a process to store the height values when lidar data falls into the respective grid cell. A binary map is then created by applying a particular threshold to the cell values for further processing. The next step is to process the radial distance and z-coordinates from each scan to identify which 3D points correspond to each of the specified grid cell leading to the process of data formation.

Mobile lidar (also mobile laser scanning) is when two or more scanners are attached to a moving vehicle to collect data along a path. These scanners are almost always paired with other kinds of equipment, including GNSS receivers and IMUs. One example application is surveying streets, where power lines, exact bridge heights, bordering trees, etc. all need to be taken into account. Instead of collecting each of these measurements individually in the field with a tachymeter, a 3D model from a point cloud can be created where all of the measurements needed can be made, depending on the quality of the data collected. This eliminates the problem of forgetting to take a measurement, so long as the model is available, reliable and has an appropriate level of accuracy.

== Applications ==
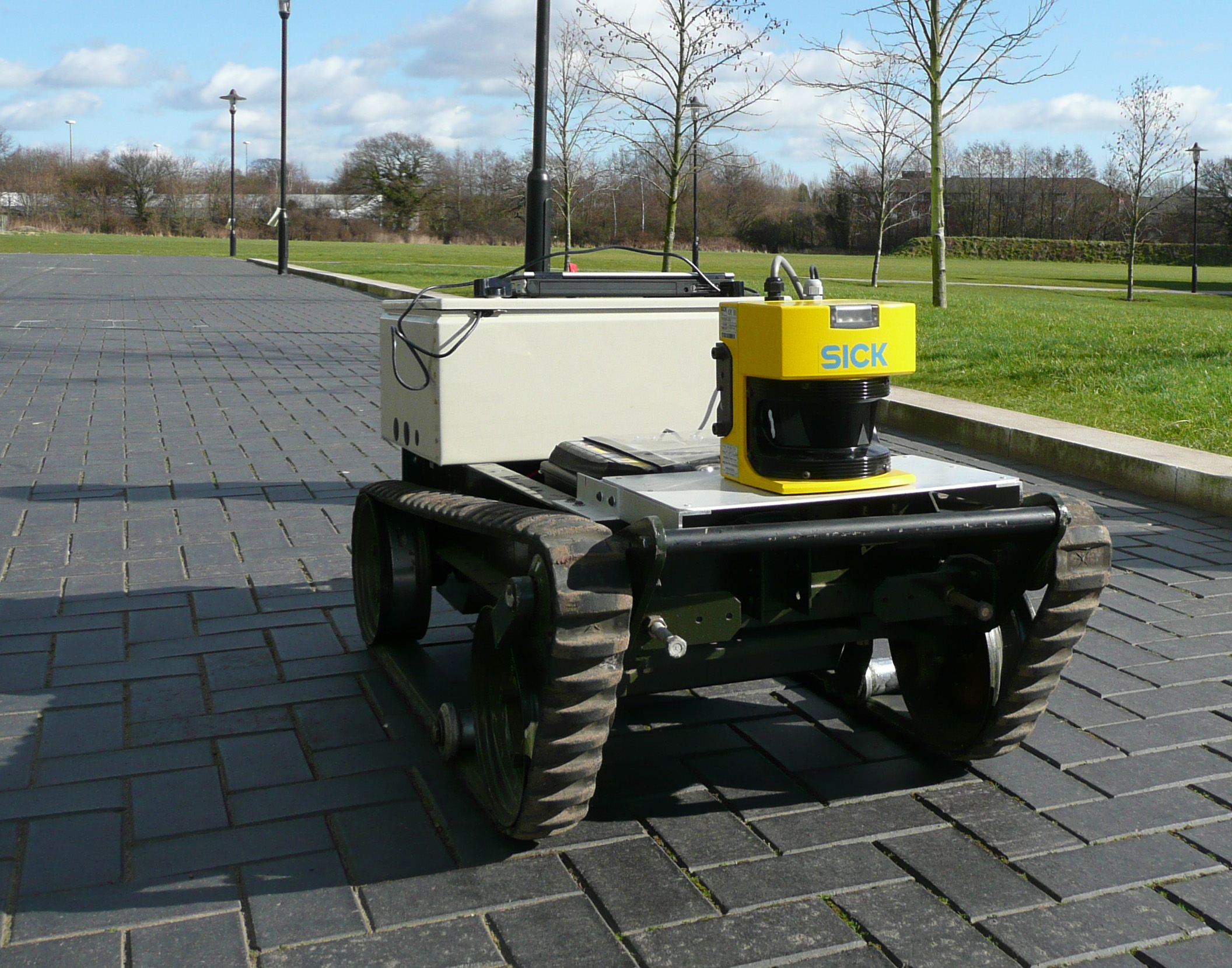
This mobile robot uses its lidar to construct a map and avoid obstacles.

There are a wide variety of lidar applications, in addition to the applications listed below, as it is often mentioned in national lidar dataset programs. These applications are largely determined by the range of effective object detection; resolution, which is how accurately the lidar identifies and classifies objects; and reflectance confusion, meaning how well the lidar can see something in the presence of bright objects, like reflective signs or bright sun.

Companies are working to cut the cost of lidar sensors, currently anywhere from about US$1,200 to more than $12,000. Lower prices will make lidar more attractive for new markets.

=== Energy ===
==== Solar photovoltaic deployment optimization ====
Lidar can be used to assist planners and developers in optimizing solar photovoltaic systems at the city level by determining appropriate roof tops and for determining shading losses. Recent airborne laser scanning efforts have focused on ways to estimate the amount of solar light hitting vertical building facades, or by incorporating more detailed shading losses by considering the influence from vegetation and larger surrounding terrain.

==== Wind farm optimization ====
Lidar can also be used to increase the energy output from wind farms by accurately measuring wind speeds and wind turbulence. Experimental lidar systems can be mounted on the nacelle of a wind turbine or integrated into the rotating spinner to measure oncoming horizontal winds, winds in the wake of the wind turbine, and proactively adjust blades to protect components and increase power. Lidar is also used to characterise the incident wind resource for comparison with wind turbine power production to verify the performance of the wind turbine by measuring the wind turbine's power curve. Wind farm optimization can be considered a topic in applied eolics. Another aspect of lidar in wind related industry is to use computational fluid dynamics over lidar-scanned surfaces in order to assess the wind potential, which can be used for optimal wind farm placement.

=== Atmosphere ===
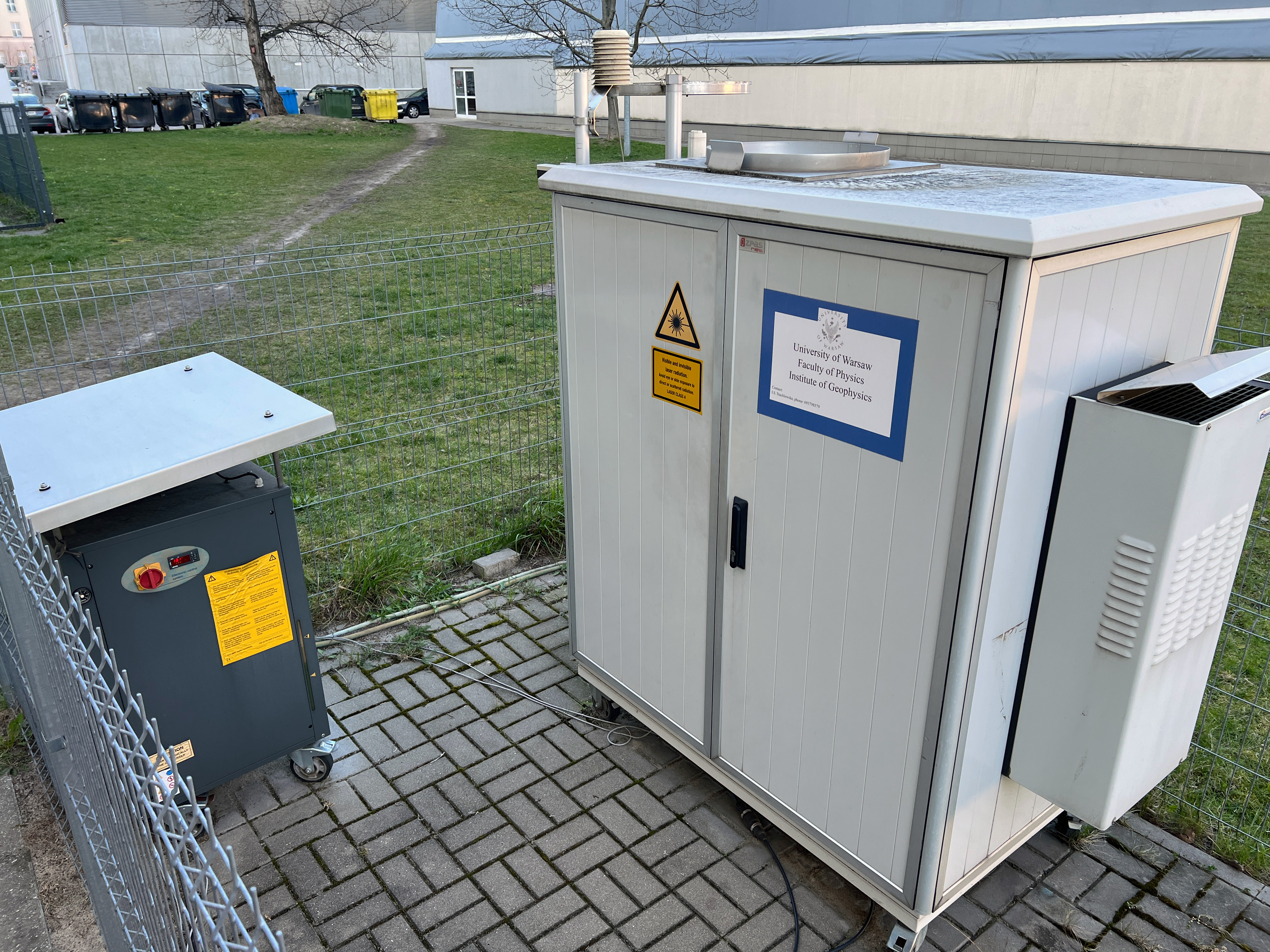
Near range lidar at Institute of Geophysics, Warsaw, Poland

Initially, based on ruby lasers, lidar for meteorological applications was constructed shortly after the invention of the laser and represents one of the first applications of laser technology. Lidar technology has since expanded vastly in capability and lidar systems are used to perform a range of measurements that include profiling clouds, measuring winds, studying aerosols, and quantifying various atmospheric components. Atmospheric components can in turn provide useful information including surface pressure (by measuring the absorption of oxygen or nitrogen), greenhouse gas emissions (carbon dioxide and methane), photosynthesis (carbon dioxide), fires (carbon monoxide), and humidity (water vapor). Atmospheric lidars can be either ground-based, airborne or satellite-based depending on the type of measurement.

Atmospheric lidar remote sensing works in two ways:

1. by measuring backscatter from the atmosphere, and
2. by measuring the scattered reflection off the ground (when the lidar is airborne) or other hard surface.

Backscatter from the atmosphere directly gives a measure of clouds and aerosols. Other derived measurements from backscatter such as winds or cirrus ice crystals require careful selecting of the wavelength and/or polarization detected. Doppler lidar and Rayleigh Doppler lidar are used to measure temperature and wind speed along the beam by measuring the frequency of the backscattered light. The Doppler broadening of gases in motion allows the determination of properties via the resulting frequency shift. Scanning lidars, such as NASA's conical-scanning HARLIE, have been used to measure atmospheric wind velocity. The ESA wind mission ADM-Aeolus will be equipped with a Doppler lidar system in order to provide global measurements of vertical wind profiles. A doppler lidar system was used in the 2008 Summer Olympics to measure wind fields during the yacht competition.

Doppler lidar systems are also now beginning to be successfully applied in the renewable energy sector to acquire wind speed, turbulence, wind veer, and wind shear data. Both pulsed and continuous wave systems are being used. Pulsed systems use signal timing to obtain vertical distance resolution, whereas continuous wave systems rely on detector focusing.

The term eolics has been proposed to describe the collaborative and interdisciplinary study of wind using computational fluid mechanics simulations and Doppler lidar measurements.

The ground reflection of an airborne lidar gives a measure of surface reflectivity (assuming the atmospheric transmittance is well known) at the lidar wavelength, however, the ground reflection is typically used for making absorption measurements of the atmosphere. "Differential absorption lidar" (DIAL) measurements utilize two or more closely spaced (less than 1 nm) wavelengths to factor out surface reflectivity as well as other transmission losses, since these factors are relatively insensitive to wavelength. When tuned to the appropriate absorption lines of a particular gas, DIAL measurements can be used to determine the concentration (mixing ratio) of that particular gas in the atmosphere. This is referred to as an integrated path differential absorption (IPDA) approach, since it is a measure of the integrated absorption along the entire lidar path. IPDA lidars can be either pulsed or CW and typically use two or more wavelengths. IPDA lidars have been used for remote sensing of carbon dioxide and methane.

Synthetic array lidar allows imaging lidar without the need for an array detector. It can be used for imaging Doppler velocimetry, ultra-fast frame rate imaging (millions of frames per second), as well as for speckle reduction in coherent lidar. An extensive lidar bibliography for atmospheric and hydrospheric applications is given by Grant.

THOR is a laser designed toward measuring Earth's atmospheric conditions. The laser enters a cloud cover and measures the thickness of the return halo. The sensor has a fiber optic aperture with a width of 7 1/2 inches (19 cm) that is used to measure the return light.

=== Media ===
The video for the 2007 song "House of Cards" by Radiohead was believed to be the first use of real-time 3D laser scanning to record a music video. The range data in the video is not completely from a lidar, as structured light scanning is also used.

In 2020, Apple introduced the fourth generation of iPad Pro with a lidar sensor integrated into the rear camera module, especially developed for augmented reality (AR) experiences. The feature was later included in the iPhone 12 Pro lineup and subsequent Pro models. On Apple devices, lidar empowers portrait mode pictures with night mode, quickens auto focus and improves accuracy in the Measure app.

In 2022, Wheel of Fortune started using lidar technology to track when Vanna White moves her hand over the puzzle board to reveal letters. The first episode to have this technology was in the season 40 premiere.

==== Video games ====
Recent simulation racing games such as rFactor Pro, iRacing, Assetto Corsa and Project CARS increasingly feature race tracks reproduced from 3D point clouds acquired through lidar surveys, resulting in surfaces replicated with centimeter or millimeter precision in the in-game 3D environment.

The 2017 exploration game Scanner Sombre, by Introversion Software, uses lidar as a fundamental game mechanic.

In Build the Earth, lidar is used to create accurate renders of terrain in Minecraft to account for any errors (mainly regarding elevation) in the default generation. The process of rendering terrain into Build the Earth is limited by the amount of data available in region as well as the speed it takes to convert the file into block data.

=== Military ===
Few military applications are known to be in place and are classified (such as the lidar-based speed measurement of the AGM-129 ACM stealth nuclear cruise missile), but a considerable amount of research is underway in their use for imaging. Higher resolution systems collect enough detail to identify targets, such as tanks. Examples of military applications of lidar include the Airborne Laser Mine Detection System (ALMDS) for counter-mine warfare by Areté Associates.

A NATO report (RTO-TR-SET-098) evaluated the potential technologies to do stand-off detection for the discrimination of biological warfare agents. The potential technologies evaluated were long-wave infrared (LWIR), differential scattering (DISC), and ultraviolet laser-induced fluorescence (UV-LIF). The report concluded that : Based upon the results of the lidar systems tested and discussed above, the Task Group recommends that the best option for the near-term (2008–2010) application of stand-off detection systems is UV-LIF , however, in the long-term, other techniques such as stand-off Raman spectroscopy may prove to be useful for identification of biological warfare agents.

Short-range compact spectrometric lidar based on laser-induced fluorescence (LIF) would address the presence of bio-threats in aerosol form over critical indoor, semi-enclosed and outdoor venues such as stadiums, subways, and airports. This near real-time capability would enable rapid detection of a bioaerosol release and allow for timely implementation of measures to protect occupants and minimize the extent of contamination.

The Long-Range Biological Standoff Detection System (LR-BSDS) was developed for the U.S. Army to provide the earliest possible standoff warning of a biological attack. It is an airborne system carried by helicopter to detect synthetic aerosol clouds containing biological and chemical agents at long range. The LR-BSDS, with a detection range of 30 km or more, was fielded in June 1997. Five lidar units produced by the German company Sick AG were used for short range detection on Stanley, the autonomous car that won the 2005 DARPA Grand Challenge.

A robotic Boeing AH-6 performed a fully autonomous flight in June 2010, including avoiding obstacles using lidar.

=== Physical security ===
Lidar technology enhances physical security by providing precise, privacy-compliant threat detection for applications such as perimeter protection, building facades, and critical infrastructure monitoring. These systems utilize laser-based sensors to create high-density point clouds that function reliably in challenging environmental conditions, including rain, snow, and complete darkness. A key advantage of modern systems is the use of 3D lidar, which creates precise volumetric detection zones capturing height, width, and depth, allowing for the accurate classification of object size and movement speed. Unlike 2D lidar systems, which typically scan a single flat plane and may struggle to distinguish between threats and benign triggers based on height or volume, 3D lidar effectively filters out false alarms caused by small animals or vegetation by analyzing the full spatial dimensions of the detected object.

=== Physics and astronomy ===
A worldwide network of observatories uses lidars to measure the distance to reflectors placed on the Moon, allowing the position of the Moon to be measured with millimeter precision and tests of general relativity to be done. MOLA, the Mars Orbiting Laser Altimeter, used a lidar instrument in a Mars-orbiting satellite (the NASA Mars Global Surveyor) to produce a spectacularly precise global topographic survey of the red planet. Laser altimeters produced global elevation models of Mars, the Moon (Lunar Orbiter Laser Altimeter (LOLA)), and Mercury (Mercury Laser Altimeter (MLA), NEAR–Shoemaker Laser Rangefinder (NLR)). Future missions will also include laser altimeter experiments such as the Ganymede Laser Altimeter (GALA) as part of the Jupiter Icy Moons Explorer (JUICE) mission.

In September, 2008, the NASA Phoenix lander used lidar to detect snow in the atmosphere of Mars.

In atmospheric physics, lidar is used as a remote detection instrument to measure densities of certain constituents of the middle and upper atmosphere, such as potassium, sodium, or molecular nitrogen and oxygen. These measurements can be used to calculate temperatures. Lidar can also be used to measure wind speed and to provide information about vertical distribution of the aerosol particles.

At the JET nuclear fusion research facility in the UK near Abingdon, Oxfordshire, lidar Thomson scattering is used to determine electron density and temperature profiles of the plasma.

==== Spaceflight ====
Lidar is increasingly being utilized for rangefinding and orbital element calculation of relative velocity in proximity operations and stationkeeping of spacecraft. Lidar has also been used for atmospheric studies from space. Short pulses of laser light beamed from a spacecraft can reflect off tiny particles in the atmosphere and back to a telescope aligned with the spacecraft laser. By precisely timing the lidar echo, and by measuring how much laser light is received by the telescope, scientists can accurately determine the location, distribution and nature of the particles. The result is a revolutionary new tool for studying constituents in the atmosphere, from cloud droplets to industrial pollutants, which are difficult to detect by other means.

Laser altimetry is used to make digital elevation maps of planets, including the Mars Orbital Laser Altimeter (MOLA) mapping of Mars, the Lunar Orbital Laser Altimeter (LOLA) and Lunar Altimeter (LALT) mapping of the Moon, and the Mercury Laser Altimeter (MLA) mapping of Mercury. It is also used to help navigate the helicopter Ingenuity in its record-setting flights over the terrain of Mars.

=== Primary industries ===
==== Agriculture ====
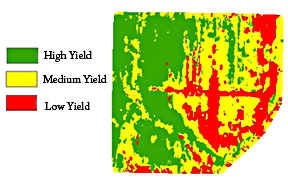
Lidar is used to analyze yield rates on agricultural fields.

Agricultural robots have been used for a variety of purposes ranging from seed and fertilizer dispersions, sensing techniques as well as crop scouting for the task of weed control.

Lidar can help determine where to apply costly fertilizer. It can create a topographical map of the fields and reveal slopes and sun exposure of the farmland. Researchers at the Agricultural Research Service used this topographical data with the farmland yield results from previous years, to categorize land into zones of high, medium, or low yield. This indicates where to apply fertilizer to maximize yield.

Lidar is now used to monitor insects in the field. The use of lidar can detect the movement and behavior of individual flying insects, with identification down to sex and species. In 2017 a patent application was published on this technology in the United States, Europe, and China.

Another application is crop mapping in orchards and vineyards, to detect foliage growth and the need for pruning or other maintenance, detect variations in fruit production, or count plants.

Lidar is useful in GNSS-denied situations, such as nut and fruit orchards, where foliage causes interference for agriculture equipment that would otherwise utilize a precise GNSS fix. Lidar sensors can detect and track the relative position of rows, plants, and other markers so that farming equipment can continue operating until a GNSS fix is reestablished.

Controlling weeds requires identifying plant species. This can be done by using 3D lidar and machine learning. Lidar produces plant contours as a "point cloud" with range and reflectance values. This data is transformed, and features are extracted from it. If the species is known, the features are added as new data. The species is labelled and its features are initially stored as an example to identify the species in the real environment. This method is efficient because it uses a low-resolution lidar and supervised learning. It includes an easy-to-compute feature set with common statistical features which are independent of the plant size.

==== Forestry ====
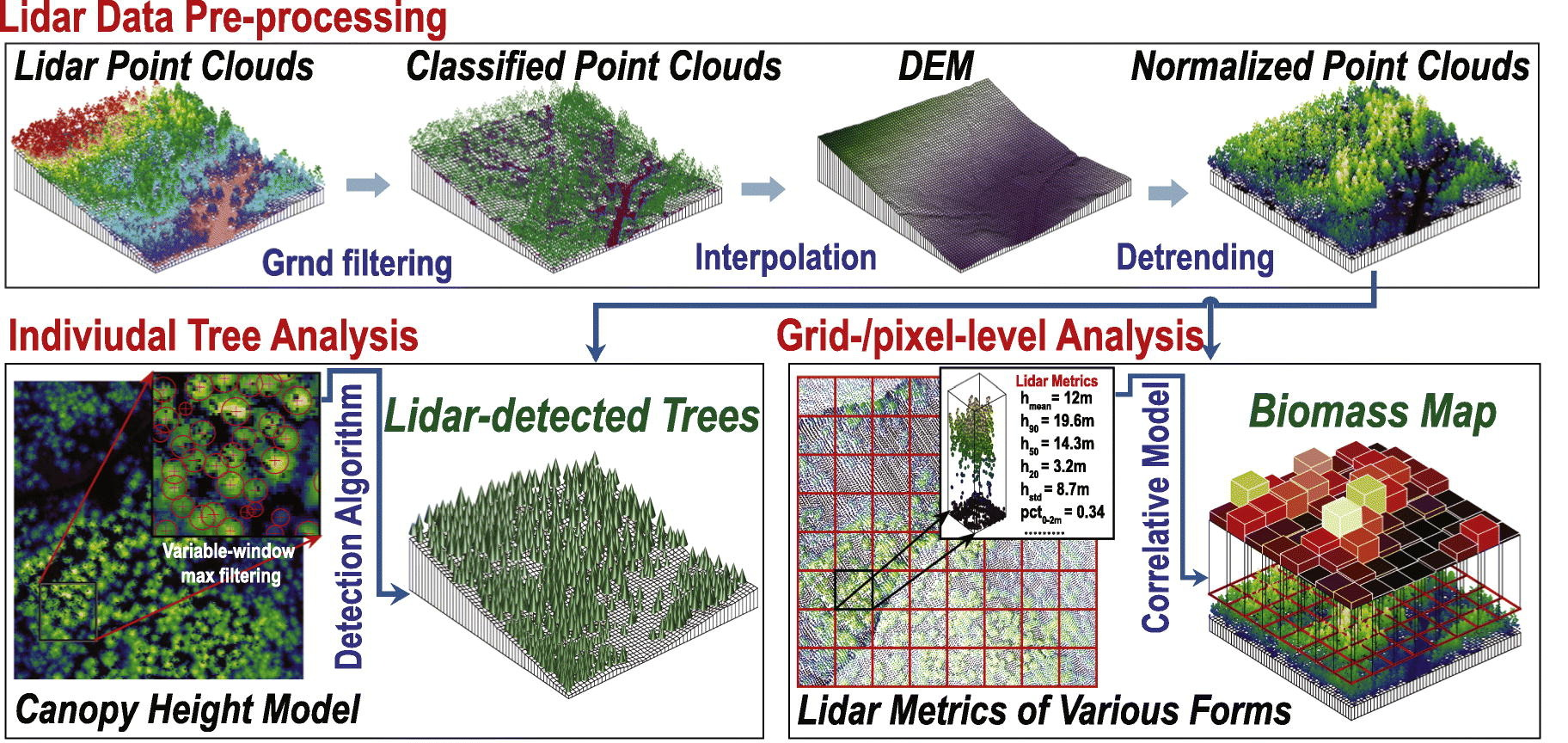
A typical workflow to derive forest information at individual tree or plot levels from lidar point clouds

Lidar systems have also been applied to improve forestry management. Measurements are used to take inventory in forest plots as well as calculate individual tree heights, crown width and crown diameter. Other statistical analysis use lidar data to estimate total plot information such as canopy volume, mean, minimum and maximum heights, vegetation cover, biomass, and carbon density. Aerial lidar was used to map the bush fires in Australia in early 2020. The data was manipulated to view bare earth, and identify healthy and burned vegetation.

==== Mining ====
The calculation of ore volumes is accomplished by periodic (monthly) scanning in areas of ore removal, then comparing surface data to the previous scan.

Lidar sensors may also be used for obstacle detection and avoidance for robotic mining vehicles such as in the Komatsu Autonomous Haulage System (AHS) used in Rio Tinto's Mine of the Future.

=== Robotics ===
Lidar technology is being used in robotics for the perception of the environment as well as object classification. The ability of lidar technology to provide three-dimensional elevation maps of the terrain, high precision distance to the ground, and approach velocity can enable safe landing of robotic and crewed vehicles with a high degree of precision. Lidar is also widely used in robotics for simultaneous localization and mapping and is well-integrated into robot simulators. Refer to the Military section above for further examples.

=== Transport ===
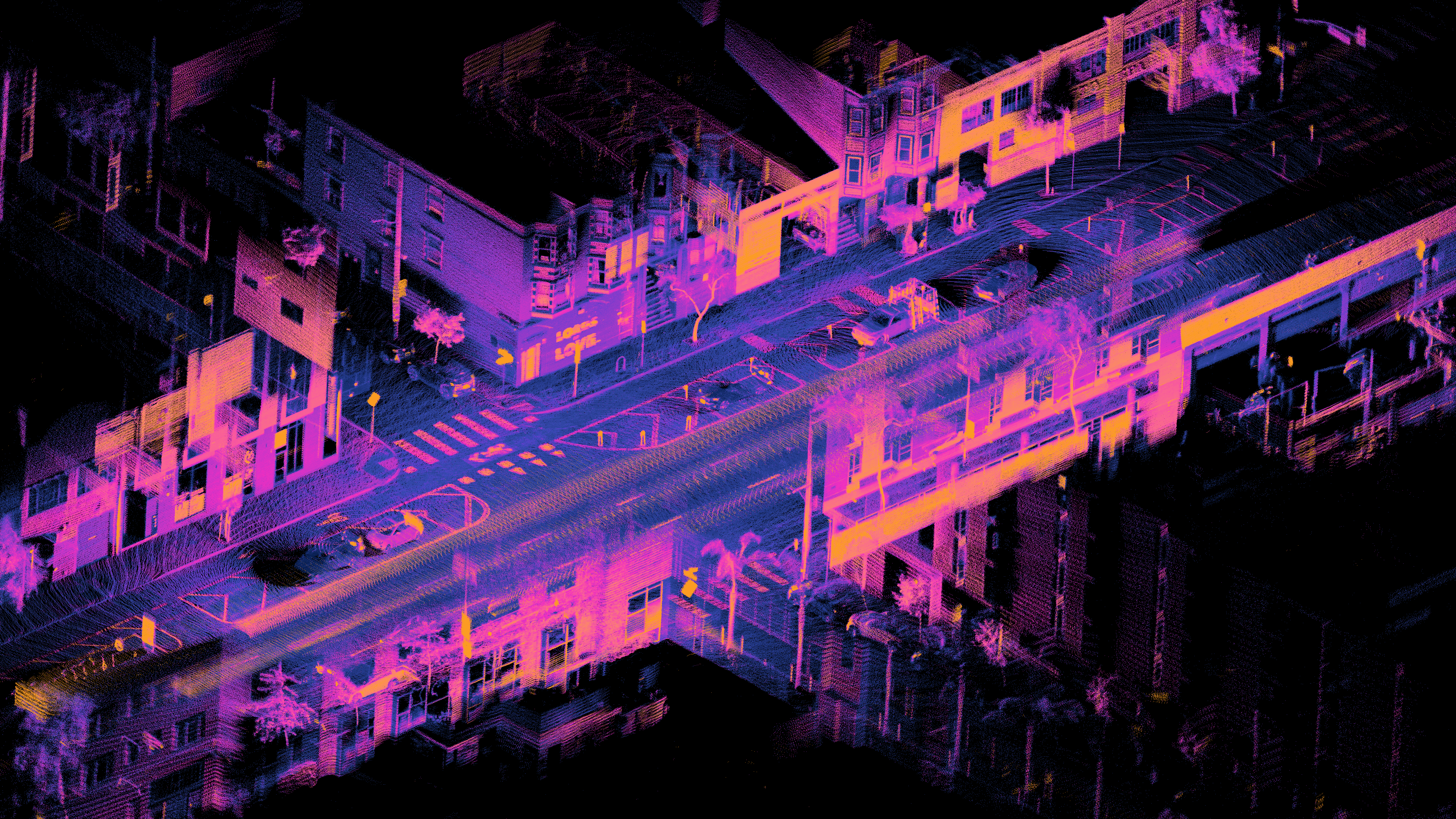
A point cloud generated from a moving car using a single Ouster OS1 lidar

Lidar has been used in the railroad industry to generate asset health reports for asset management and by departments of transportation to assess their road conditions. CivilMaps.com is a leading company in the field. Lidar has been used in adaptive cruise control (ACC) systems for automobiles. Systems such as those by Siemens, Hella, Ouster and Cepton use a lidar device mounted on the front of the vehicle, such as the bumper, to monitor the distance between the vehicle and any vehicle in front of it. In the event where the vehicle in front slows down or is too close, the ACC applies the brakes to slow the vehicle. When the road ahead is clear, the ACC allows the vehicle to accelerate to a speed preset by the driver. Refer to the Military section above for further examples. A lidar-based device, the Ceilometer, is used at airports worldwide to measure the height of clouds on runway approach paths.

==== Airport operations ====
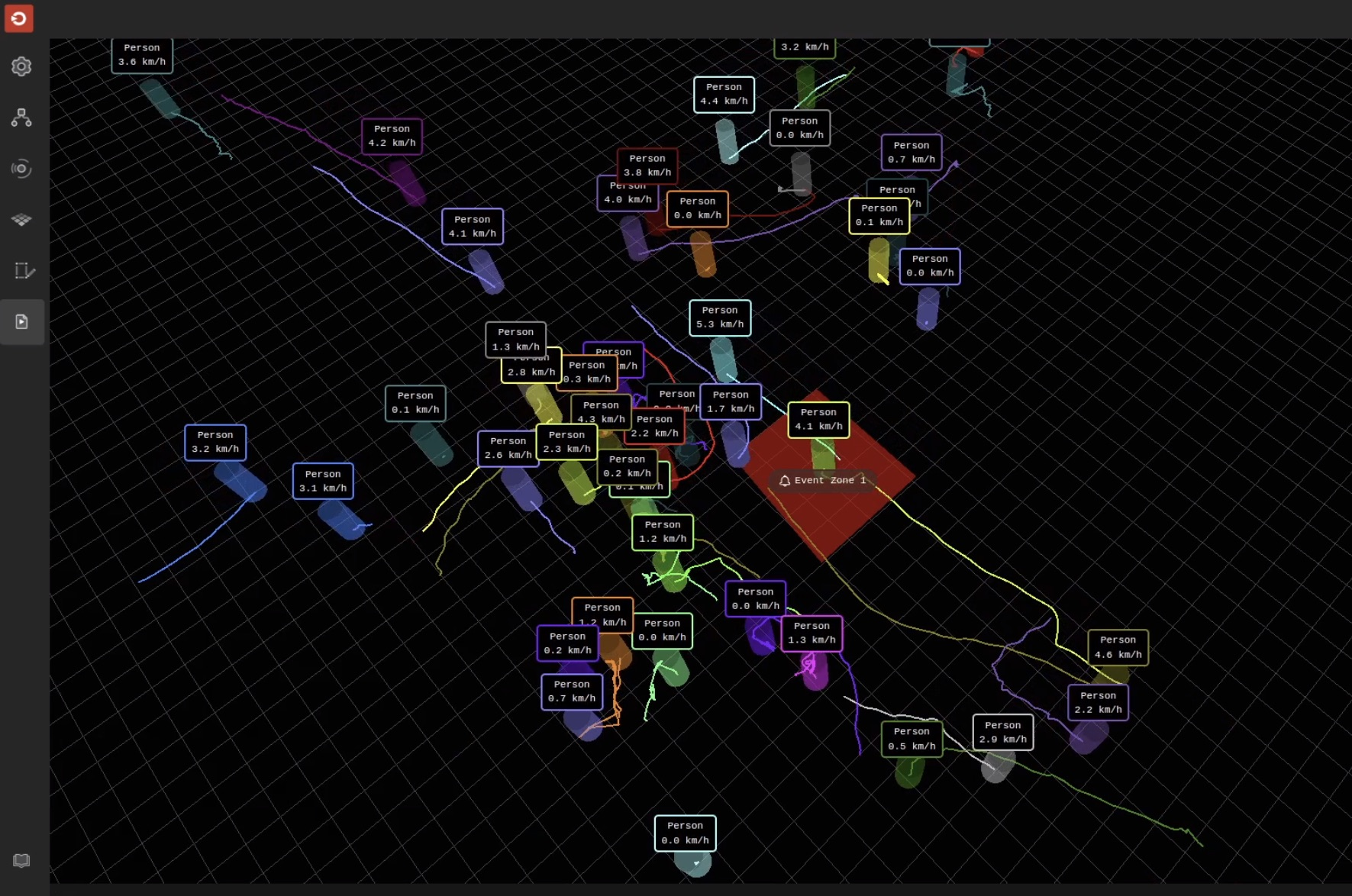
A lidar-based spatial intelligence system tracking individual passengers in real time at passport control.

In April 2025, Dallas Fort Worth International Airport announced the deployment of a lidar-based platform for real-time monitoring of passenger and vehicle flows.

==== Autonomous vehicles ====
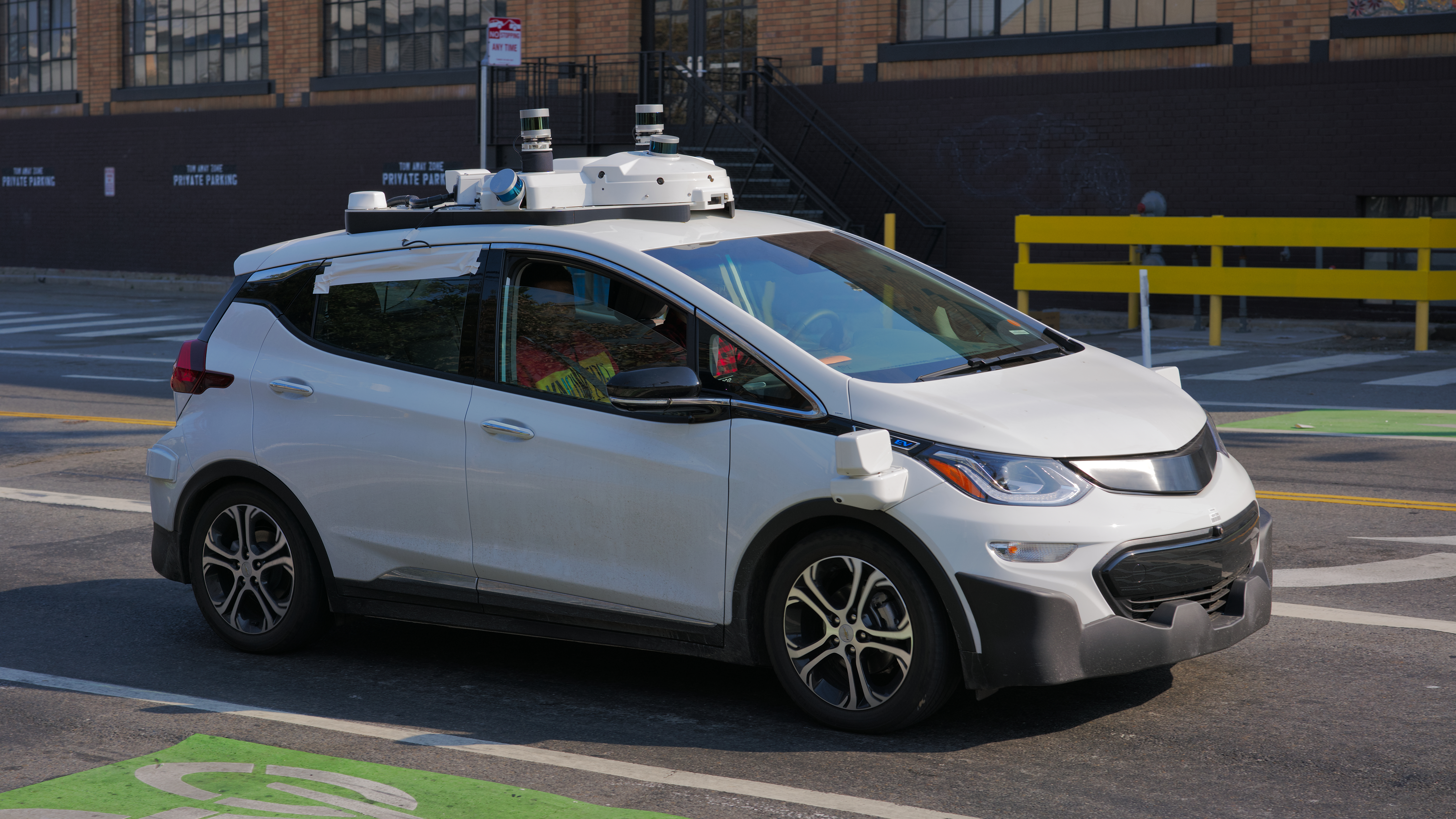
Cruise Automation self-driving car with five Velodyne Lidar units on the roof

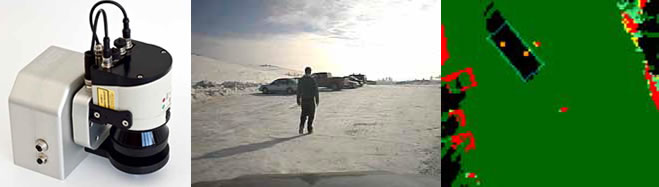
Forecast 3D laser system using a SICK LMC lidar sensor

Autonomous vehicles may use lidar for obstacle detection and avoidance to navigate safely through environments. The introduction of lidar was a pivotal occurrence that was the key enabler behind Stanley, the first autonomous vehicle to successfully complete the DARPA Grand Challenge. Point cloud output from the lidar sensor provides the necessary data for robot software to determine where potential obstacles exist in the environment and where the robot is in relation to those potential obstacles. Singapore's Singapore-MIT Alliance for Research and Technology (SMART) is actively developing technologies for autonomous lidar vehicles.

The very first generations of automotive adaptive cruise control systems used only lidar sensors.

In transportation systems, to ensure vehicle and passenger safety and to develop electronic systems that deliver driver assistance, understanding the vehicle and its surrounding environment is essential. Lidar systems play an important role in the safety of transportation systems. Many electronic systems which enhance driver assistance and vehicle safety such as adaptive cruise control (ACC), emergency brake assist, and anti-lock braking system (ABS) depend on the detection of a vehicle's environment to act autonomously or semi-autonomously. Lidar mapping and estimation achieve this.

Current lidar systems use rotating hexagonal mirrors which split the laser beam. The upper three beams are used for vehicle and obstacles ahead, and the lower beams are used to detect lane markings and road features. The major advantage of using lidar is that the spatial structure is obtained and this data can be fused with other sensors such as radar, etc. to get a better picture of the vehicle environment in terms of static and dynamic properties of the objects present in the environment. Conversely, a significant issue with lidar is the difficulty in reconstructing point cloud data in poor weather conditions. In heavy rain, for example, the light pulses emitted from the lidar system are partially reflected off of rain droplets which adds noise to the data, called 'echoes'.

Obstacle detection and road environment recognition using lidar, proposed by Kun Zhou et al. not only focuses on object detection and tracking but also recognizes lane marking and road features. As mentioned earlier, the lidar systems use rotating hexagonal mirrors that split the laser beam into six beams. The upper three layers are used to detect the forward objects such as vehicles and roadside objects. The sensor is made of weather-resistant material. The data detected by lidar are clustered to several segments and tracked by Kalman filter. Data clustering here is done based on characteristics of each segment based on object model, which distinguish different objects such as vehicles, signboards, etc. These characteristics include the dimensions of the object, etc. The reflectors on the rear edges of vehicles are used to differentiate vehicles from other objects. Object tracking is done using a two-stage Kalman filter considering the stability of tracking and the accelerated motion of objects Lidar reflective intensity data is also used for curb detection by making use of robust regression to deal with occlusions. Road marking is detected using a modified Otsu method by distinguishing rough and shiny surfaces.

Roadside reflectors that indicate lane border are sometimes hidden due to various reasons. Therefore, other information is needed to recognize the road border. The lidar used in this method can measure the reflectivity from the object. Hence, with this data the road border can also be recognized. Also, the usage of a sensor with a weather-robust head helps to detect the objects even in bad weather conditions. Canopy height model before and after a flood is a good example. Lidar can detect highly detailed canopy height data as well as its road border. Lidar measurements help identify the spatial structure of the obstacle. This helps distinguish objects based on size and estimate the impact of driving over it. Lidar systems provide better range and a large field of view, which helps in detecting obstacles on the curves. This is one of its major advantages over radar systems, which have a narrower field of view. The fusion of lidar measurement with different sensors makes the system robust and useful in real-time applications, since lidar-dependent systems cannot estimate the dynamic information about the detected object. It has been shown that lidar can be manipulated, such that self-driving cars are tricked into taking evasive action.

==== Traffic enforcement ====
Lidar can be used in traffic enforcement and in particular speed limit enforcement, where it has become increasingly common since the 1990s with the release of the Laser Technology Inc. 20-20. Modern lidar-based systems can automate speed detection, vehicle identification, and evidentiary documentation, though driver identification is not as commonly automated.

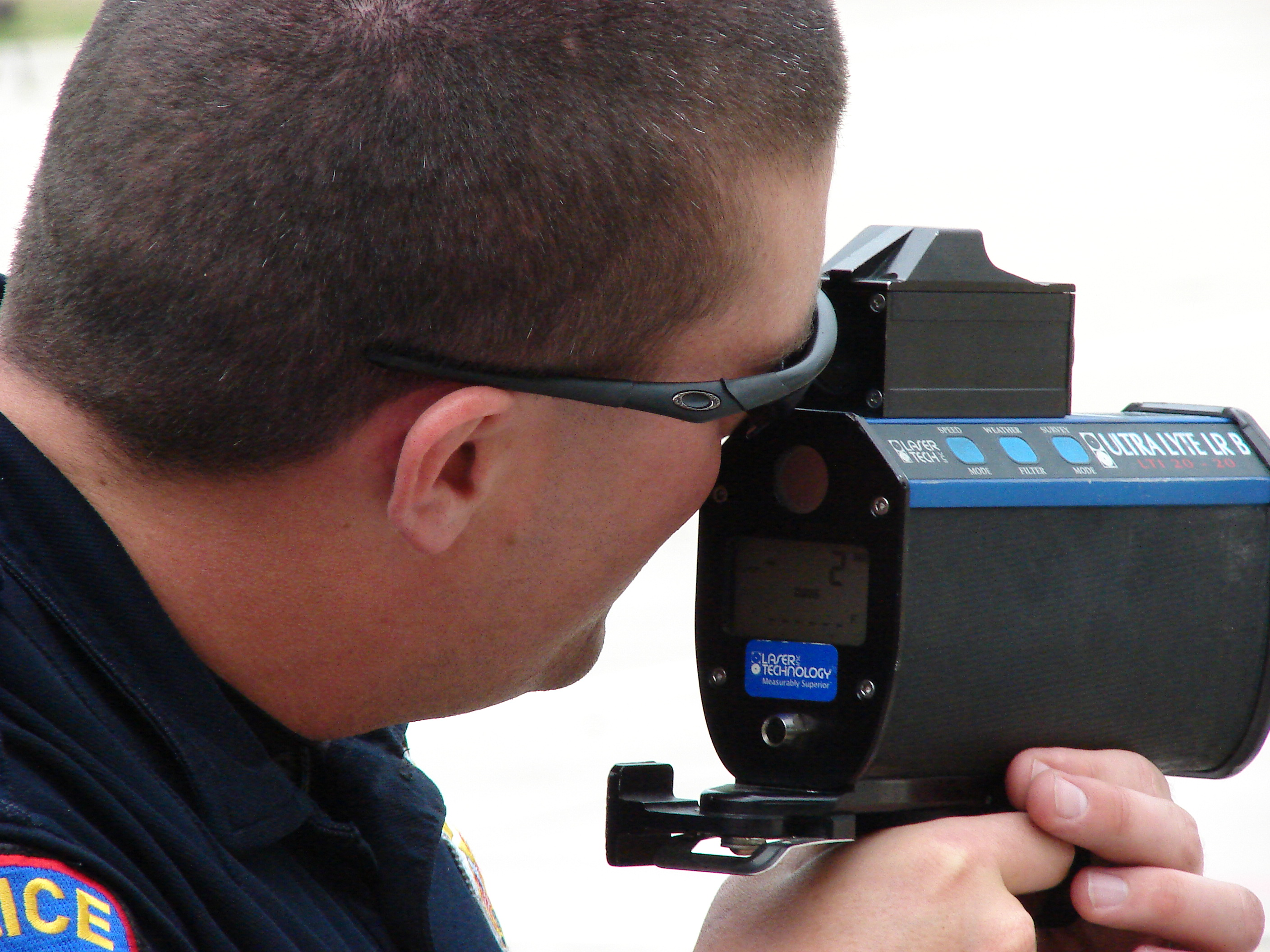
Police officer operating a hand-held lidar speed detection device

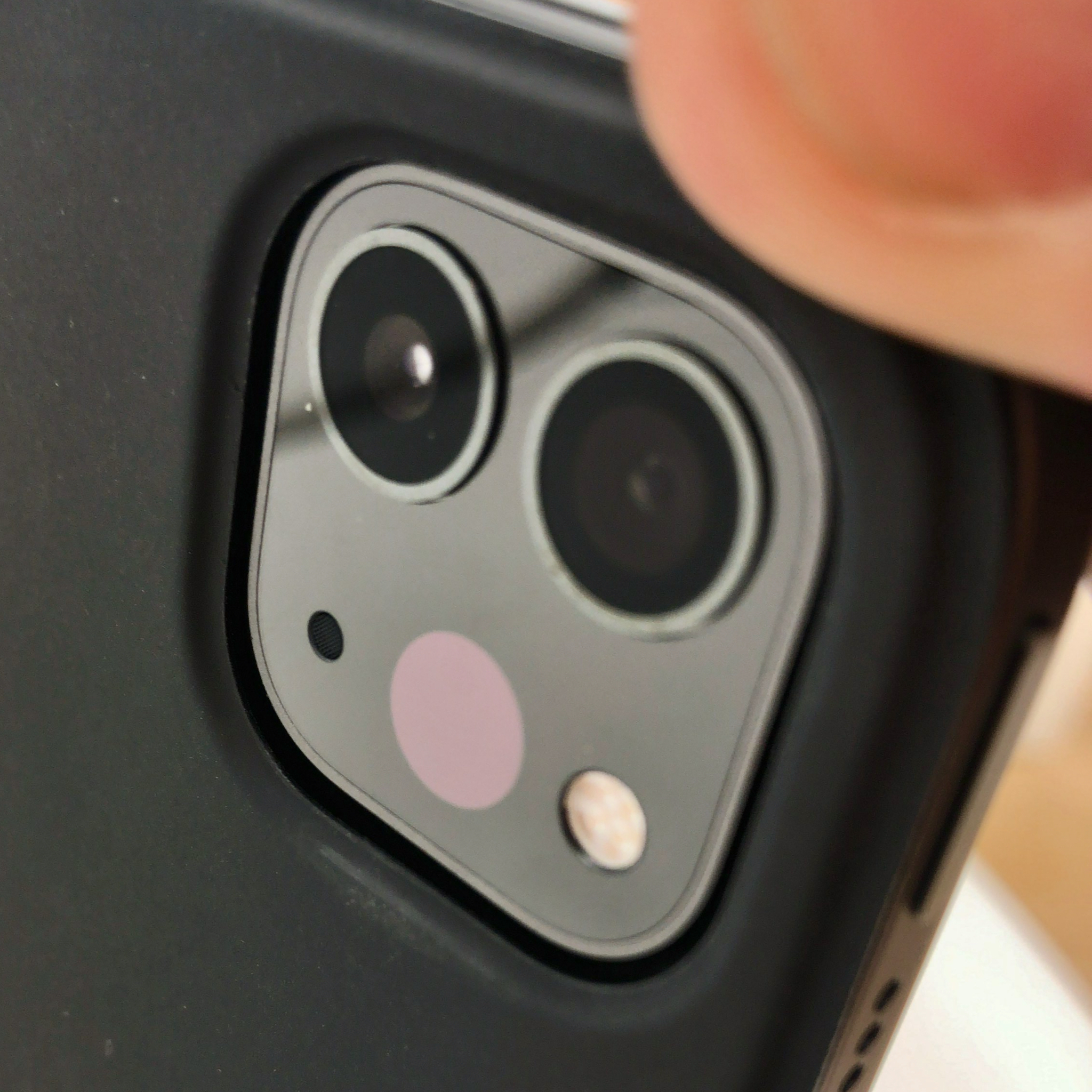
On a 4th generation iPad Pro, the black circle in the bottom left is a lidar scanner

=== Other applications ===
With the high accuracy and high-efficiency data acquisition method of laser scanning, it can potentially apply to different areas other than structural measurements:

- Emergency inspections and landslide mapping
- Project management (with the need of 3D models / topographic data)
- Site progress, the volume of excavation or filling
- Volumetric calculations
- Topographic mapping
- Building and highway construction
- Natural disasters assessments
- Unreachable area data collection
- Precision farming
- As-built construction records
- Unauthorised works (e.g. capturing of field situation)
- Monitoring surface deformation with continuous and repeated LiDAR scanning
- Archaeology and site reconstructions
- Seismology
- Forestry
- Atmospheric physics
- Extraterrestrial explorations

== Alternative technologies ==
Computer stereo vision has shown promise as an alternative to lidar for close-range applications. It is significantly more cost effective when appropriate.

== See also ==
- Geological structure measurement by LiDAR – Terrain measurement with light beams
- Lidar detector – Used to measure the speed of vehicles
- Mobile mapping – Process of collecting geospatial data from a mobile vehicle
- Photogrammetry – Taking measurements using photography
- Range imaging – Measuring technique
- Time-domain reflectometry – Electronic instrument
