= Starfire Optical Range =

U.S. directed-energy weapon/telecom research facility

Coordinates: 34.9643°N 106.4626°W

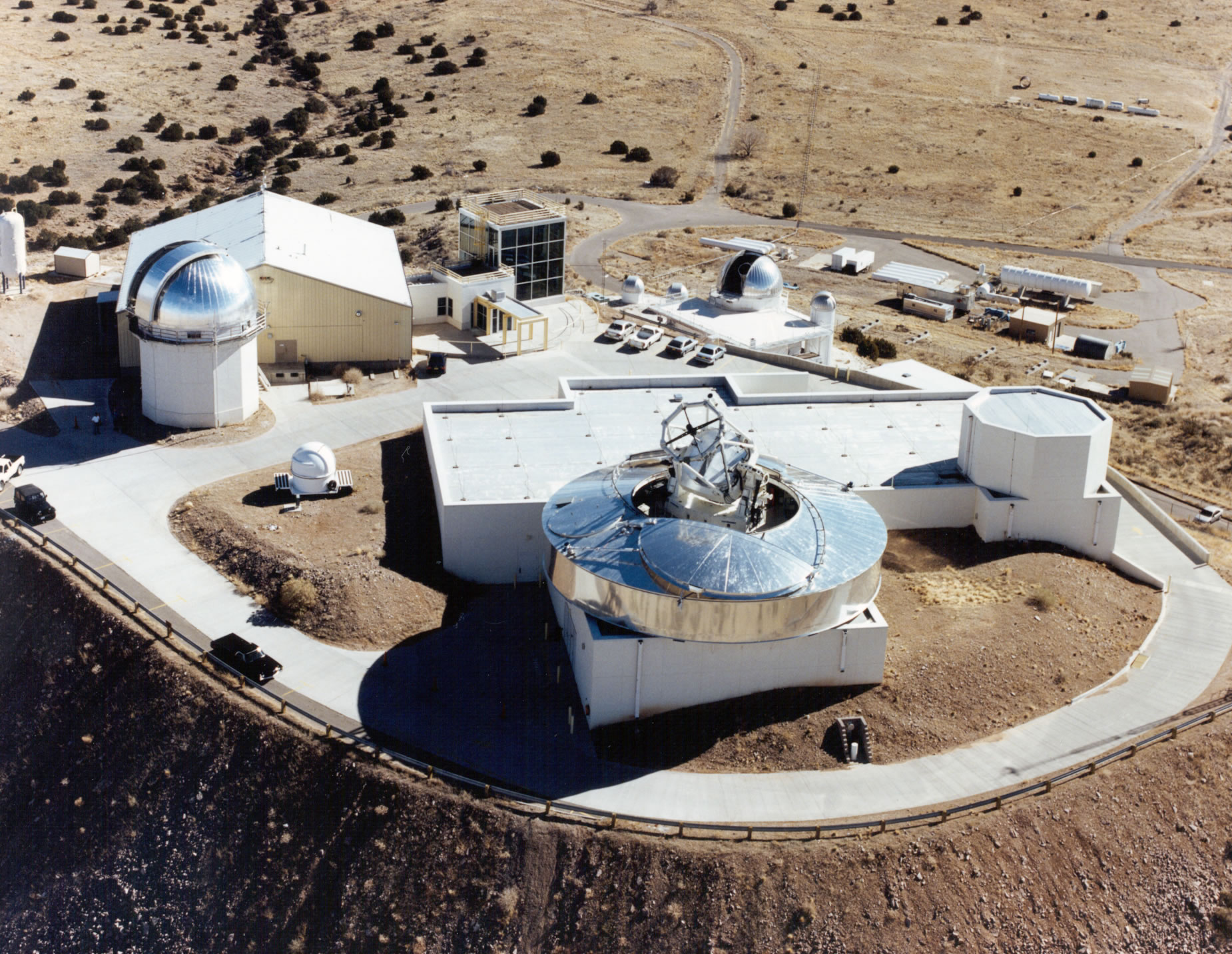
The Starfire Optical Range, as viewed from a helicopter.

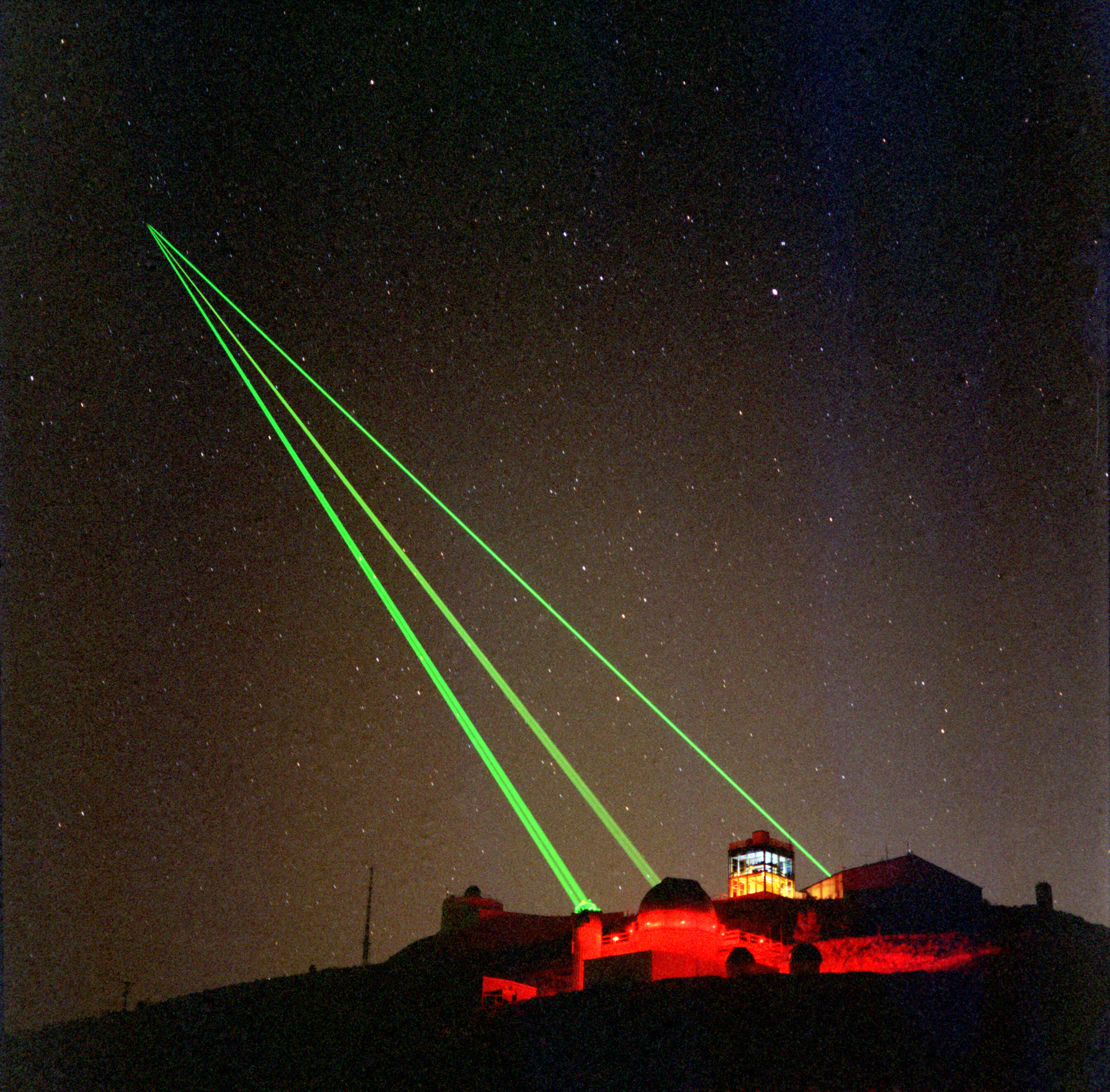
Three green lasers being fired at a single spot in the sky from the Starfire Optical Range.

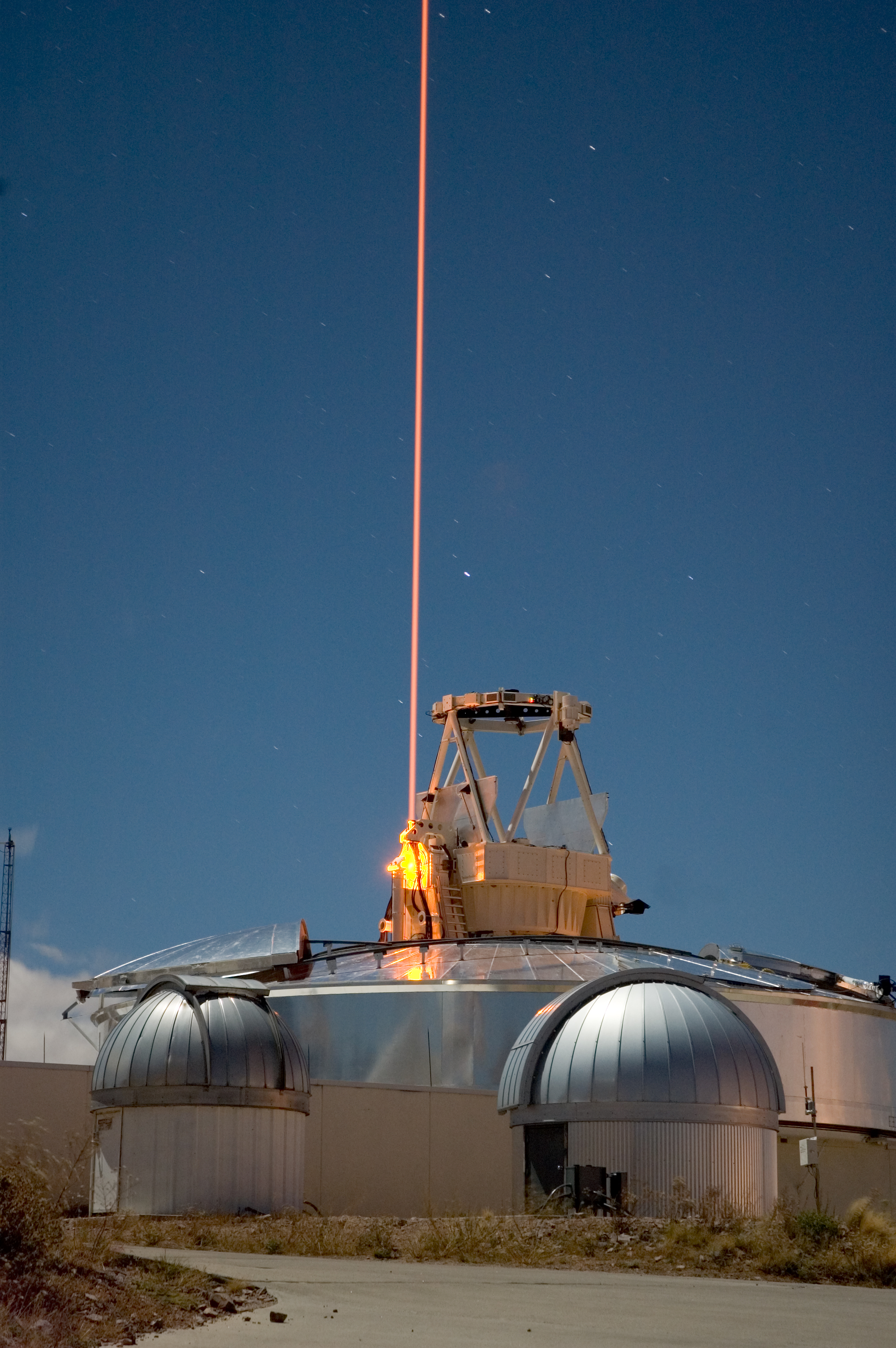
A FASOR used at the Starfire Optical Range for LIDAR and laser guide star experiments is tuned to the sodium D2a line and used to excite sodium atoms in the upper atmosphere.

Starfire Optical Range (SOR) is a United States Air Force research laboratory on the Kirtland Air Force Base in Albuquerque, New Mexico. Its primary duty, according to the official website, is to "develop and demonstrate optical wavefront control technologies." The range is a secure lab facility and is a division of the Directed Energy Directorate of the Air Force Research Laboratory.

SOR's optical equipment includes a 3.5 meter telescope which is "one of the largest telescopes in the world equipped with adaptive optics designed for satellite tracking" according to the Air Force, a 1.5 meter telescope, and a 1-meter beam director.

== Purpose ==
The purpose of Starfire is to conduct research to use adaptive optics to remove the effects of scintillation (atmospheric turbulence). Turbulence interferes with laser beam integrity over distances. Lasers are being used for long-distance high-bandwidth communications and accuracy in air-to-air laser connectivity is important for data integrity.

Scintillation is also a problem in development of weaponized lasers, such as the airborne laser being developed to intercept intercontinental ballistic missiles.

== See also ==
- North Oscura Peak
- List of the largest optical telescopes in the contiguous United States
