= Sodium layer =

Thin layer of Earth's upper atmosphere

During the 2026 Artemis II mission astronaut Reid Wiseman photographed Hello, World, Earth's full disk with the surrounding sodium layer visible encircling it.

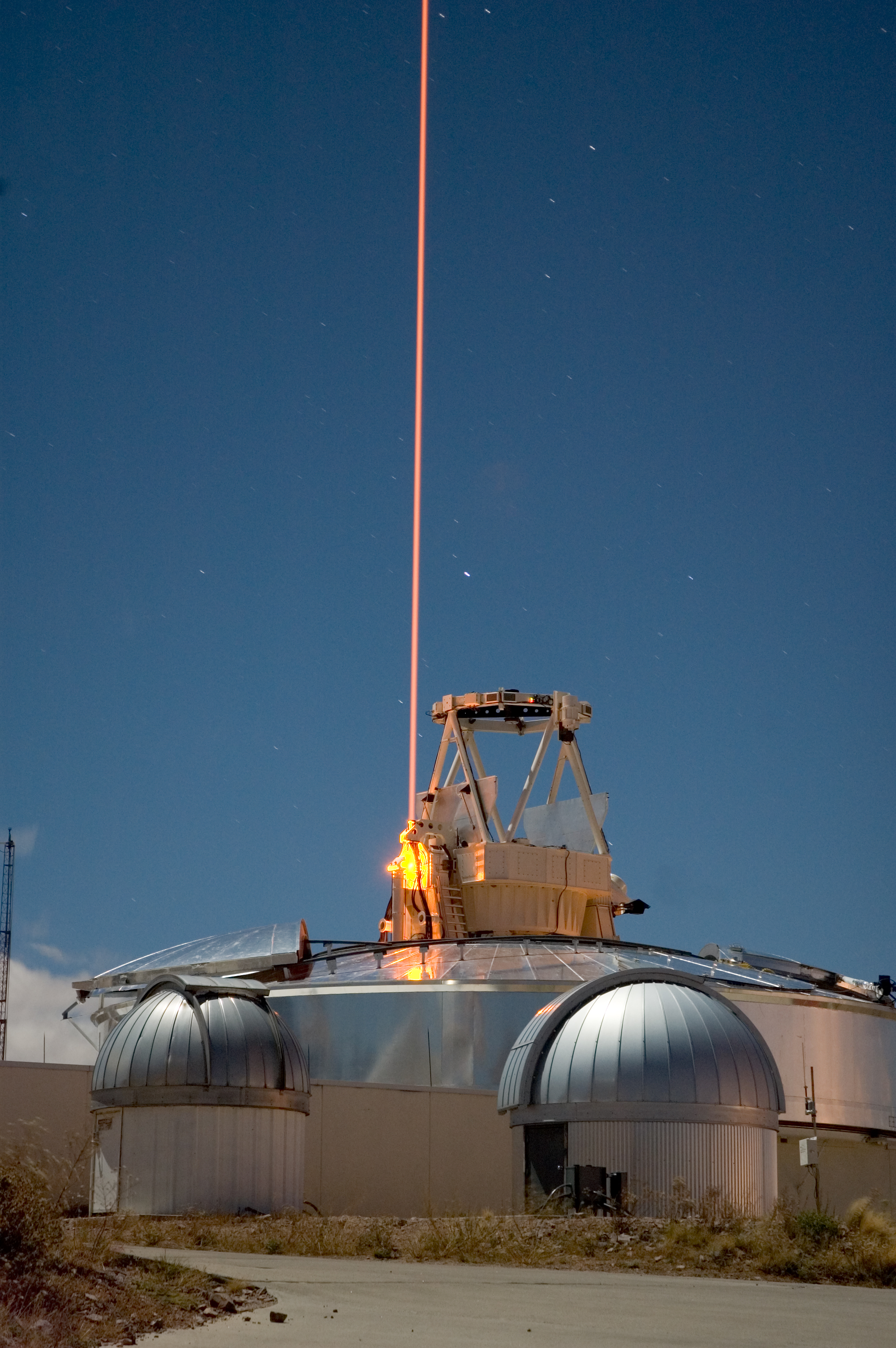
A FASOR used at the Starfire Optical Range for LIDAR and laser guide star experiments is tuned to the sodium D2a line and used to excite sodium atoms in the upper atmosphere.

The sodium layer is a layer of neutral atoms of sodium within Earth's mesosphere. This layer usually lies within an altitude range of 80–105 km (50–65 mi) above sea level and has a depth of about 5 km (3.1 mi). The sodium comes from the ablation of meteors. Atmospheric sodium below this layer is normally chemically bound in compounds such as sodium oxide, while the sodium atoms above the layer tend to be ionized.

The density varies with season; the average column density (the number of atoms per unit area above any point on the Earth's surface) is roughly 4 billion sodium atoms/cm^{2}. For a typical thickness of 5 km this corresponds to volume density of roughly 8000 sodium atoms/cm^{3}.

Atoms of sodium in this layer can become excited due to sunlight, solar wind, or other causes. Once excited, these atoms radiate very efficiently around 589 nm, which is in the yellow portion of the spectrum. These radiation bands are known as the sodium D lines. The resulting radiation is one of the sources of air glow.

Astronomers have found the sodium layer to be useful for creating an artificial laser guide star in the upper atmosphere. The star is used by adaptive optics to compensate for movements in the atmosphere. As a result, optical telescopes can perform much closer to their theoretical limit of resolution.

The sodium layer was first discovered in 1929 by American astronomer Vesto Slipher. In 1939 the British-American geophysicist Sydney Chapman proposed a reaction-cycle theory to explain the night-glow phenomenon.
