= Toptica Photonics =

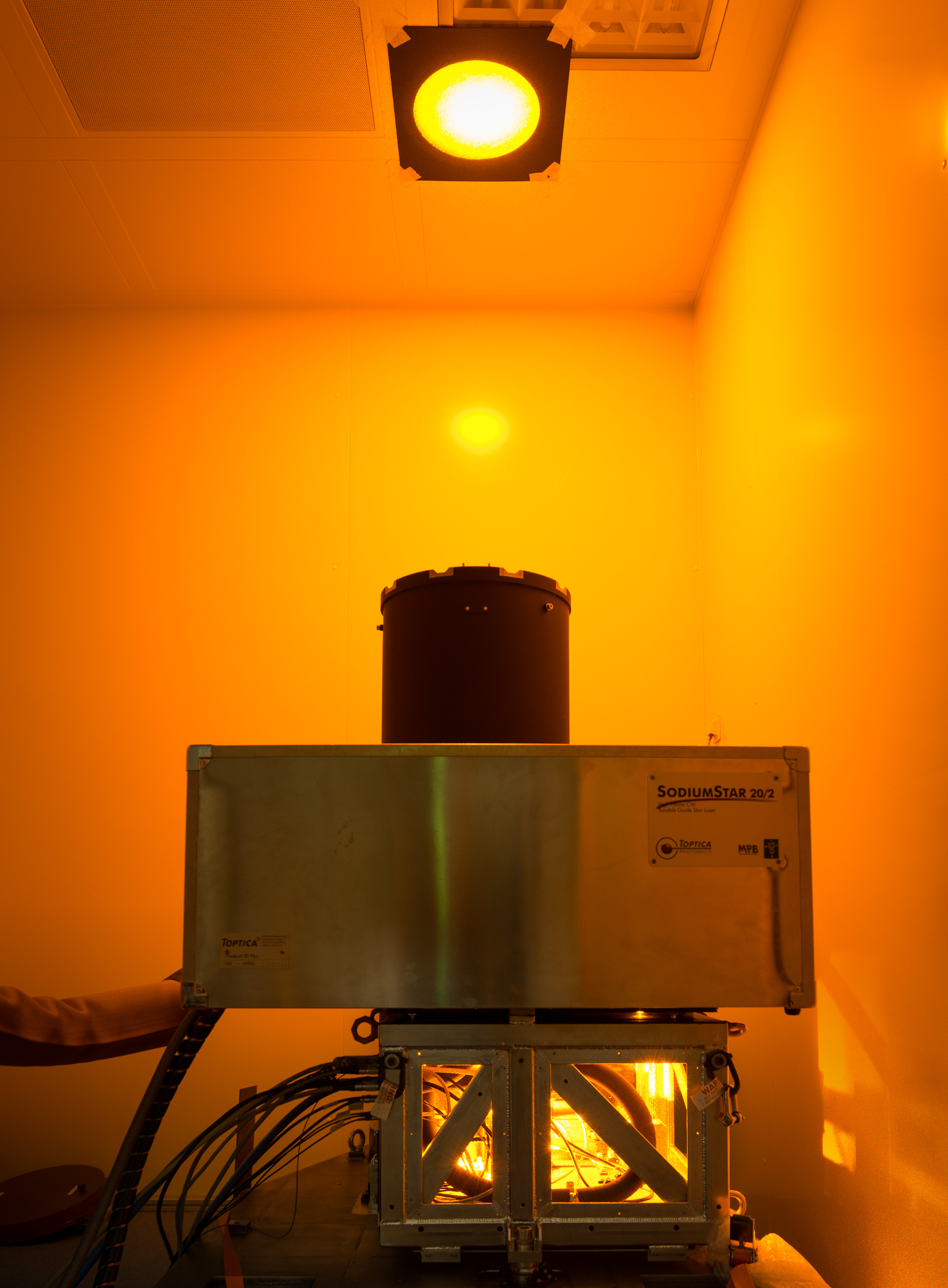
22-watt Toptica Photonics sodium guide star for ESO's Very Large Telescope

TOPTICA Photonics is a German manufacturer of lasers for quantum technologies, biophotonics and material inspection.

== History ==
The company was initially founded in February 1998 under the name TuiOptics GmbH for selling grating tuned diode lasers, but in 2001 it was renamed to TOPTICA Photonics AG. TOPTICA won the contract to provide laser guide stars for the Very Large Telescope in 2010 and for the Extremely Large Telescope in 2017. TOPTICA sponsored the joint OSA/DPG Herbert Walther Award and the American Physical Society's 2018 Norman F. Ramsey Prize. Since 2021 Toptica is entitled for research and development incentivation from the state of Germany (BSFZ).

== Locations and corporate structure ==
TOPTICA Photonics SE is a privately held joint-stock company headquartered in Graefelfing near Munich in Germany with more than 400 employees. Its subsidiary TOPTICA Photonics Inc. maintains the US facilities in New York State, whereas the Japanese subsidiary TOPTICA Photonics K.K. is headquartered in Tokyo and the Chinese subsidiaries are located in Beijing and Shanghai. The subsidiary TOPTICA Projects GmbH develops laser guide stars. In 2023 Azurlight Systems (France) was acquired and added under the name TOPTICA Photonics SAS. TOPTICA Photonics AG has been operating as TOPTICA Photonics SE (Societas Europaea, SE) since July 18, 2025. The Toptica group today has 620 employees in 7 entities with a consolidated group revenue of close to 140 Mio € (155 Mio $).

Executive Board: Dr. Wilhelm Kaenders (Founder & CTO), Dr. Thomas Renner (CSO), Dr. Mathias Schindler (COO), Fabian Uhl (CFO)
