= List of the largest optical telescopes in North America =

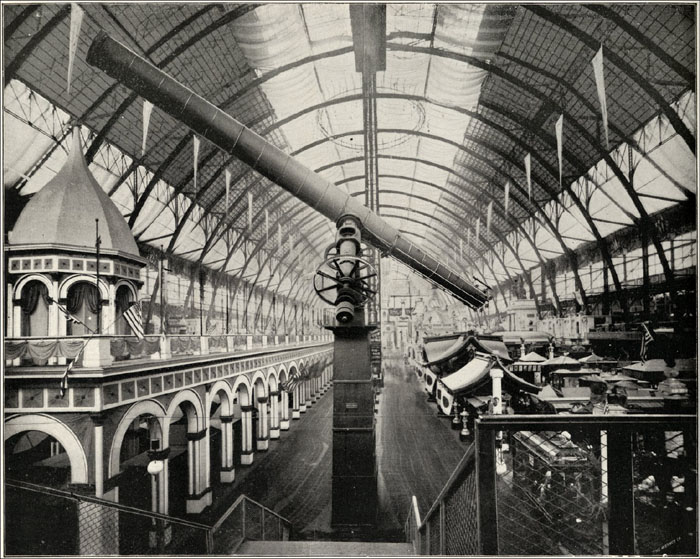
The Yerkes Great refractor mounted at the 1893 World's Fair in Chicago

This is a list of the largest optical telescopes in North America.

== 21st century ==
A list of optical telescopes located in North America by aperture.

Name	Image	Effective aperture m	Aper. in	Mirror type	Nationality / Sponsors	Site	Built
Large Binocular Telescope (LBT)		11.9 m (8.4 m×2)	330" × 2	Multiple mirror, 2	USA, Italy, Germany	Mount Graham International Obs., Arizona, USA	2004
W. M. Keck Observatory		10m each	394"	Hexagonal Segments, 36 per telescope	United States	Mauna Kea Observatories	1990,1993
Hobby–Eberly Telescope (HET) (11 m × 9.8 m mirror)		10 m	394"	Segmented, 91	USA, Germany	McDonald Observatory, Texas, USA	1997
Subaru (JNLT)		8.2 m	323"	Single	Japan	Mauna Kea Observatories, Hawaii, USA	1999
MMT (1 x 6.5 M1)		6.5 m	256"	Single	USA	F. L. Whipple Obs., Arizona, USA	2000
Hale Telescope (200 inch)		5.08 m	200"	Single	USA	Palomar Observatory, California, USA	1948
MMT (6 × 1.8 m) original optics		4.7 m (6 × 1.8 m)	186"	Segmented, 6	USA	F. L. Whipple Obs., Arizona, USA	1979–1998
Lowell Discovery Telescope		4.3 m	169"	Single	USA	Lowell Observatory, Happy Jack, Arizona	2012
Daniel K. Inouye Solar Telescope		4 m	158"	Single	USA	Haleakala Observatory, Hawaii, USA	2019
Nicholas U. Mayall 4m		4 m	158"	Single	USA	Kitt Peak National Obs., Arizona, USA	1973
USAF Starfire 3.5 m		3.5 m	138"	Single	USA	Starfire Optical Range, New Mexico, USA	1994
WIYN Telescope		3.5 m	138"	Single	USA	Kitt Peak National Obs., Arizona, USA	1994
Astrophysical Research Consortium (ARC)		3.48 m	137"	Single	USA	Apache Point Obs., New Mexico, USA	1994
Shane Telescope		3.05 m	120"	Single	USA	Lick Observatory, California, USA	1959
NASA-LMT retired		3 m	118"	Liquid	USA	NASA Orbital Debris Obs., New Mexico, USA	1995–2002
For telescopes below 3 meters see List of large optical telescopes

== Refractors ==
Some of the big traditional refracting lens telescopes in North America:

Name/Observatory	Location	Lens diameter	Focal length	Built	Comments	Image
Yerkes Observatory	Williams Bay, Wisconsin, USA	102 cm (40")	19.4 m (62′)	1897	Largest in operation	
James Lick telescope Lick Observatory	Mount Hamilton, California, USA	91 cm (36")	17.6 m	1888		
William Thaw Telescope; Allegheny Observatory	Pittsburgh, Pennsylvania, USA	76 cm (30")	14.1 m	1914	Brashear made, photographic	
Leander McCormick Observatory	Charlottesville, Virginia, USA	66 cm (26")	9.9 m	1884	completed c. 1874, installed 1884	
U.S. Naval Observatory	Foggy Bottom Washington, DC, USA moved to Northwest, Washington, D.C., 1893	66 cm (26")	9.9 m	1873	Largest refractor in 1873. Alvan Clark & Sons mounting replaced with Warner & Swasey mounting in 1893.	
Sproul Observatory	Pennsylvania, USA	61 cm (24")	11.0 m (36 ft)	1911	Currently under restoration to be re-installed in Northwest Arkansas	
Lowell Observatory	Arizona, USA	61 cm (24")	9.75 m (32 ft)	1894	Alvan Clark & Sons telescope	

== Biggest telescopes in 1950 ==
Optical telescopes only

Name / Observatory	Image Out	Image In	Aperture	First Light	Nation
Hale Telescope; Palomar Obs.			200 inch 508 cm	1949	USA
Hooker Telescope; Mount Wilson Obs.			100 inch 254 cm	1917	USA
McDonald Obs. 82 inch i.e. Otto Struve Telescope			82 inch 208 cm	1939	USA
David Dunlap Observatory			74 inch 188 cm	1935	Canada
Plaskett telescope Dominion Astrophysical Obs.			72 inch 182 cm	1918	Canada
69-inch Perkins Telescope; Perkins Observatory			69 inch 175 cm	1931–1964	USA
Wyeth 61" reflector Oak Ridge Observatory			61 inch 155 cm	1933–2005	USA
60 inch Hale; Mount Wilson Observatory			60 inch 152.4 cm	1908	USA

== Biggest telescopes in 1900 ==
Name/Observatory	Aperture cm (in)	Type	Location then (Original Site)	Extant*
Yerkes Observatory	102 cm (40")	achromat	Williams Bay, Wisconsin, USA	1897
James Lick telescope, Lick Observatory	91 cm (36")	achromat	Mount Hamilton, California, USA	1888
Crossley Reflector	91.4 cm(36")	reflector – glass	Lick Observatory, California, USA	1896
Harvard College Observatory	71 cm (28")	reflector	Cambridge, Massachusetts, USA	1889
McCormick Observatory	67 cm (26.37")	achromat	Charlottesville, Virginia, USA	1883
U.S. Naval Observatory	66 cm (26")	achromat	Washington, DC, USA	1873
Lowell Observatory	61 cm (24")	achromat	Arizona, USA	1896
Halstead Observatory	58.4 cm (23")	achromat	Princeton, USA	1881
Chamberlin Observatory	50 cm (20")	achromat	Colorado, USA	1891
18½-in Dearborn Observatory Refractor	47 cm (18.5")	achromat	Chicago (1862–1893), Evanston, Illinois (1893), USA	1862
Flower Observatory	46 cm (18")	achromat	Philadelphia, USA	1896
Harvard Great Refractor, Harvard College Observatory	38 cm (15")	achromat	Cambridge, Massachusetts, USA	1847
Wellesley College Whitin Observatory 12-inch Fitz; Jacob Campbell's 12 inch refractor	30 cm (12")	achromat	Massachusetts, USA; New York, USA	1900; 1852
University of Illinois Observatory	30 cm (12")	achromat	Urbana, Illinois, USA	1896
Merz und Mahler (Mitchell cupola), Cincinnati Observatory	28 cm (11")	achromat	Cincinnati, Ohio, USA	1843
Fraunhofer Refractor, United States Naval Observatory (Foggy Bottom)	24.4 cm (9.6")	achromat	Foggy Bottom, D.C., USA	1844
Wesleyan University 6-inch Lerebours refractor	15.24 cm (6")	achromat	Connecticut, USA	1836
Utzschneider & Fraunhofer Comet Seeker	10.2 cm (4")	acrhomat	Foggy Bottom, D.C., USA	1843

== Biggest telescopes in 1850 ==
Some of the largest at observatories:

Name/Observatory	Aperture cm (in)	Type	Location then (Original Site)	Extant*
Harvard Great Refractor, Harvard College Observatory	38 cm (15")	achromat	Cambridge, Massachusetts, USA	1847
Merz und Mahler (Mitchell cupola), Cincinnati Observatory	28 cm (11")	achromat	Cincinnati, Ohio, USA	1843
West Point Observatory 9.75 inch Fitz equatorial	24.77 cm (9.75")	achromat	West Point, USA	1839
Fraunhofer Refractor, United States Naval Observatory (Foggy Bottom)	24.4 cm (9.6")	achromat	Foggy Bottom, D.C., USA	1844
Wesleyan University 6-inch Lerebours refractor	15.24 cm (6")	achromat	Connecticut, USA	1836
Yale Dollond 5-inch, Yale College Observatory	12.7 cm (5")	achromat	New Haven, Connecticut, USA	1828
Utzschneider & Fraunhofer Comet Seeker	10.2 cm (4")	acrhomat	Foggy Bottom, D.C., USA	1843

== See also ==
- Lists of telescopes
- List of radio telescopes
- List of largest optical reflecting telescopes (mirrors)
- List of largest optical refracting telescopes (lenses)
