= Frequency addition source of optical radiation =

Laser points of light in the sky for astronomical reference

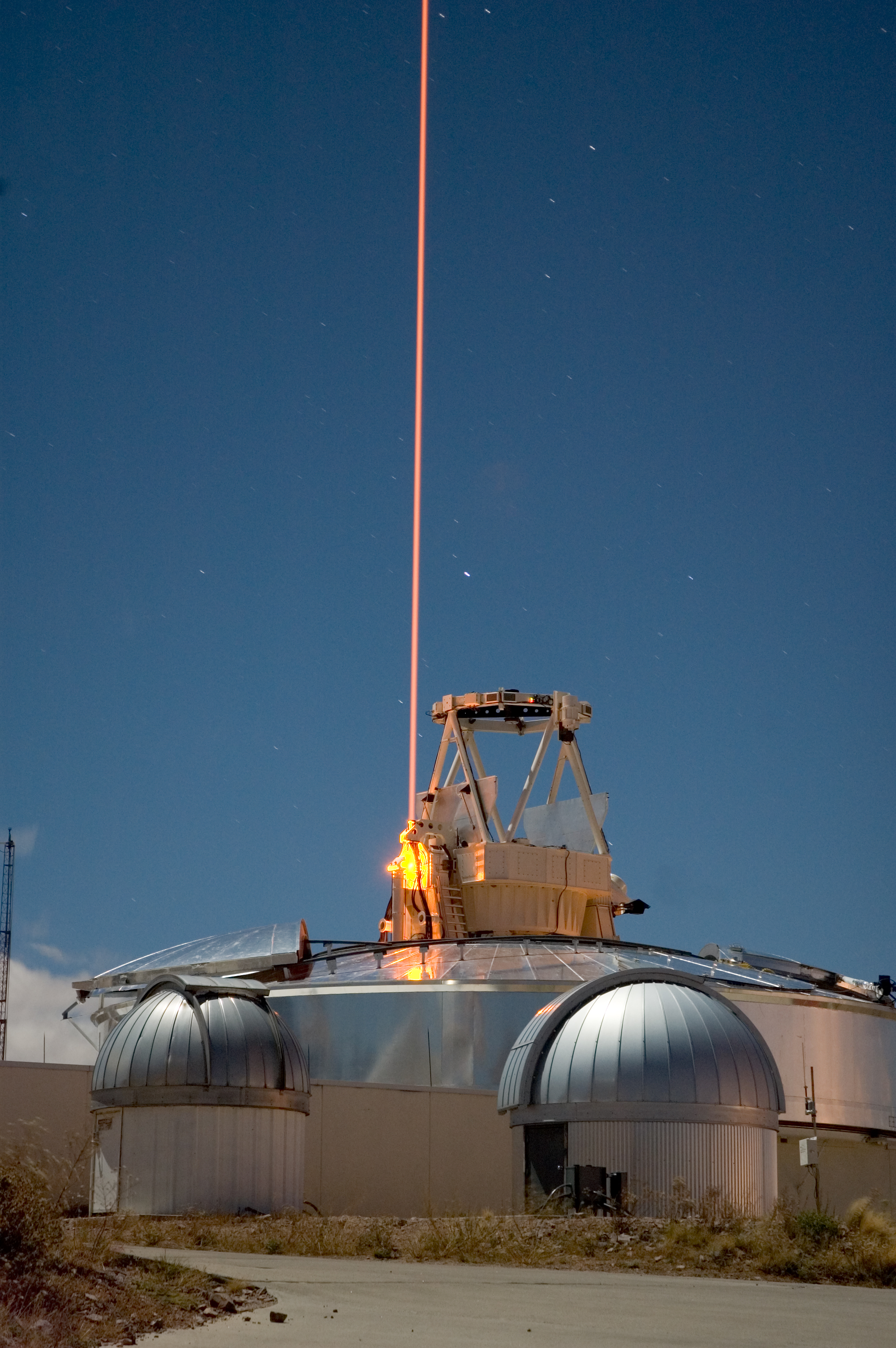
A 50W FASOR used at the Starfire Optical Range

Frequency addition source of optical radiation (acronym FASOR) is used for a certain type of guide star laser deployed at US Air Force Research Laboratory facilities SOR and AMOS. The laser light is produced in a sum-frequency generation process from two solid-state laser sources that operate at different wavelengths. The frequencies of the sources add directly to a summed frequency. Thus, if the source wavelengths are $\lambda_1$ and $\lambda_2$, the resulting wavelength is

$$\lambda = \left(\frac{1}{\lambda_1} + \frac{1}{\lambda_2} \right)^{-1}.$$

== Application ==
The FASOR was initially used for many laser guide star experiments. These have ranged from mapping the photon return versus wavelength, power, and pointing location in the sky. Two FASORS were used to show the advantages of 'back pumping' or pumping at both D2a and D2b lines. Later a FASOR was used to measure the Earth's magnetic field. It has also been used for its intended application of generating a laser guidestar for adaptive optics, see first reference. It is tuned to the D2a hyperfine component of the sodium D line and used to excite sodium atoms in the mesospheric upper atmosphere. The FASOR consists of two single-frequency injection-locked Nd:YAG lasers close to 1064 and 1319 nm that are both resonant in a cavity containing a lithium triborate (LBO) crystal, which sums the frequencies yielding 589.159 nm light.
