= Photonic radar =

Radar utilizing lasers to create and analyze RF signals

Diagram of operation of a photonic radar.

Photonic radar is a technique by which radar may be produced and analysed with the help of photonics rather than traditional RF engineering techniques. The frequency of the radar is still in the RF, but lasers are used to create and analyse the RF signals with high precision.

China, Russia and India have active research programs to equip fighter aircraft with photonic radar. The potential benefits are longer range of detection, better position sensing, and 3D model target reconstruction.

In one study, a test device could resolve objects as small as 3 x 4 cm (1.2 x 1.6 in), much smaller than traditional radar.

== Overview of operation ==
A laser diode is used to generate an optical signal that is modulated by a linearly-chirped low frequency signal. This modulated optical signal is then split, with one part immediately converted to an electronic signal at 4 times the frequency of the original modulating signal. This waveform is then amplified, emitted via a standard antenna, and then received again via another standard antenna. The second half of the modulated optical signal is further modulated by the reflected signal, and then converted to an electronic signal. This electronic signal is sent through a low-pass filter and finally digitized via an analog-to-digital converter. The resulting digital waveform can be processed to recover the delay between the transmitted and reflected signal, and thus the distance to the target. The entire system may be operated in real-time to allow high-speed target acquisition.

== Applications ==
Novel potential applications include non-invasive patient vital sign monitoring using a photonic chip small enough to include in a phone.

On 29 June 2025, India's Electronics and Radar Development Establishment, under DRDO, completed the fabrication & development of a photonic radar which will replace or complement the conventional AESA radars for fighter jets and ground based systems. Within the next few months, the system will undergo extensive trials onboard stationary testbeds and then onboard UAVs and naval vessels. It use multiple photonic transmitter/receiver modules. In 2022 tests, the prototype version of photonic radar was able to image small objects, measuring just 3 cm × 4 cm (1.2 in × 1.6 in), as they moved on a rotating plate.
