= Laser guide star =

Artificial star image used by telescopes

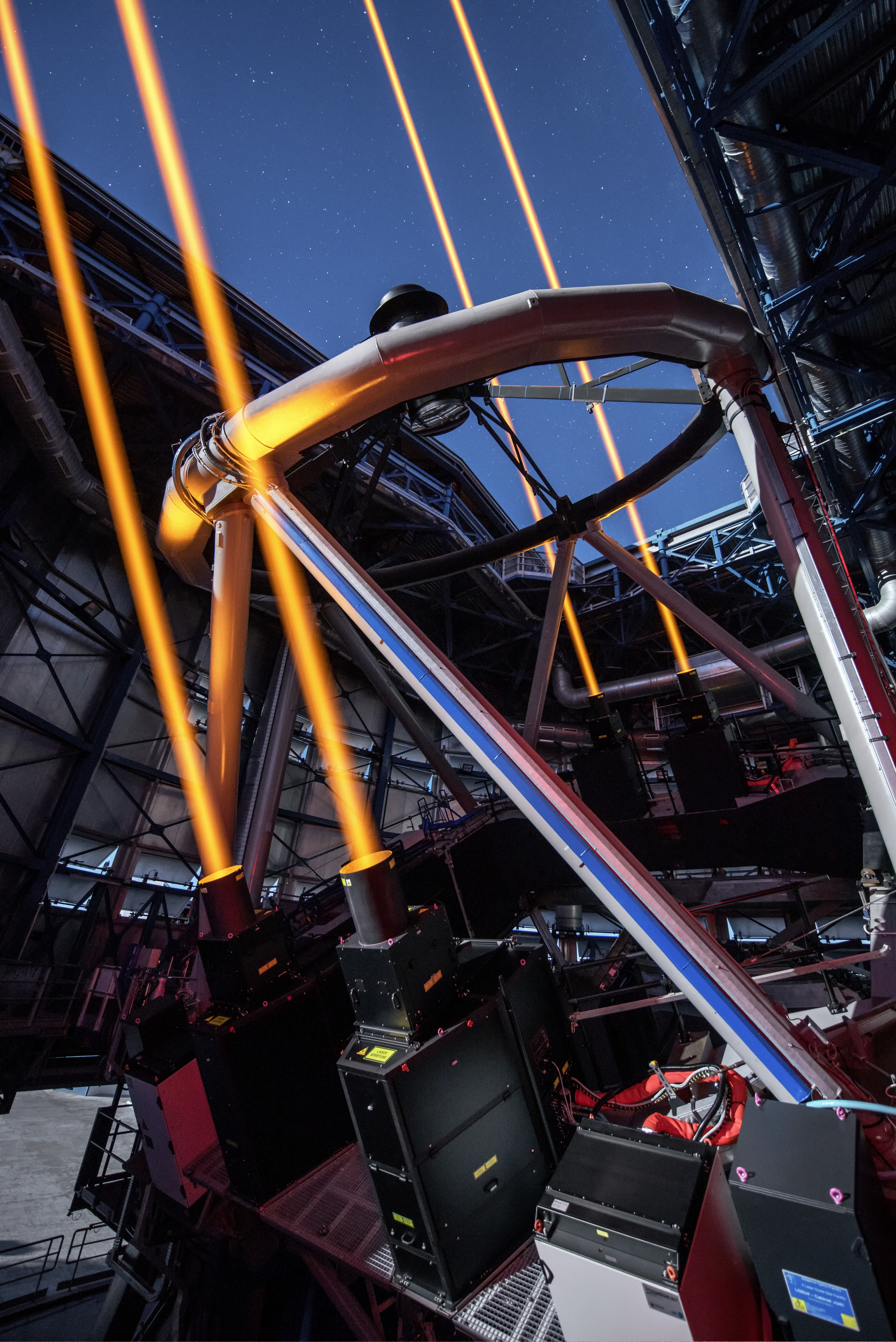
Powerful laser guide star system at the Paranal Observatory.

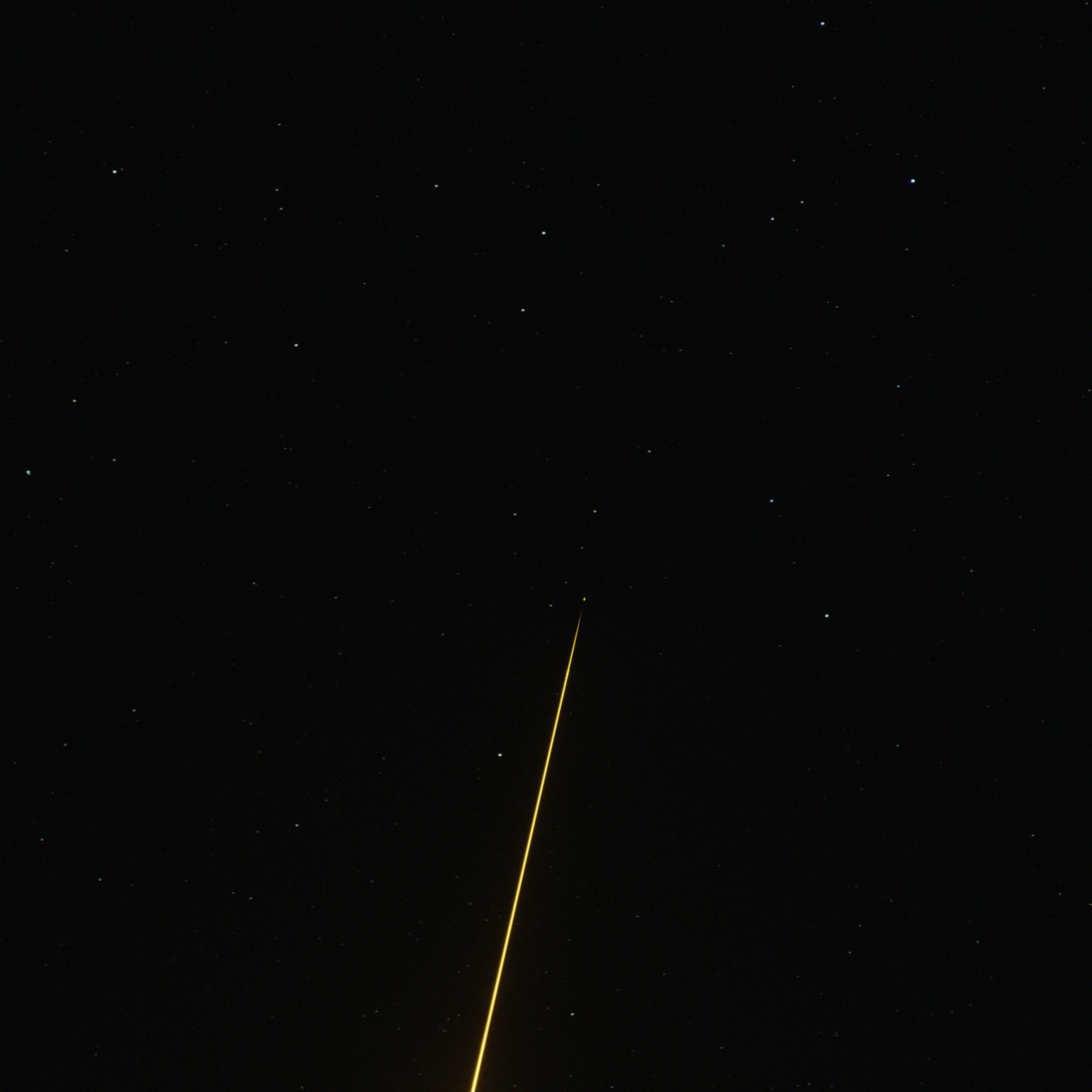
The actual laser guide star is the small spot above the apparent end of the laser beam.

A laser guide star is an artificial star image created for use in astronomical adaptive optics systems, which are employed in large telescopes in order to correct atmospheric distortion of light, a phenomenon termed astronomical seeing. Adaptive optics (AO) systems require a wavefront reference source of light called a guide star. While natural stars can serve as point sources for this purpose, sufficiently bright stars are not common enough to appear in all parts of the sky, limiting the usefulness of adaptive optics in these areas. To compensate for this, an artificial guide star can be created by shining a laser into Earth's atmosphere. Light from the beam is reflected by components in the upper atmosphere back into the telescope. This star can be positioned anywhere the telescope desires to point, opening up much greater amounts of the sky to adaptive optics.

Because the laser beam is deflected by astronomical seeing on the way up, the returning laser light does not move around in the sky as astronomical sources do. In order to keep astronomical images steady, a natural star nearby in the sky must be monitored in order that the motion of the laser guide star can be subtracted using a tip-tilt mirror. However, this star can be much fainter than is required for natural guide star adaptive optics because it is used to measure only tip and tilt, and all higher-order distortions are measured with the laser guide star. This means that many more stars are suitable, and a correspondingly larger fraction of the sky is accessible.

== Types ==
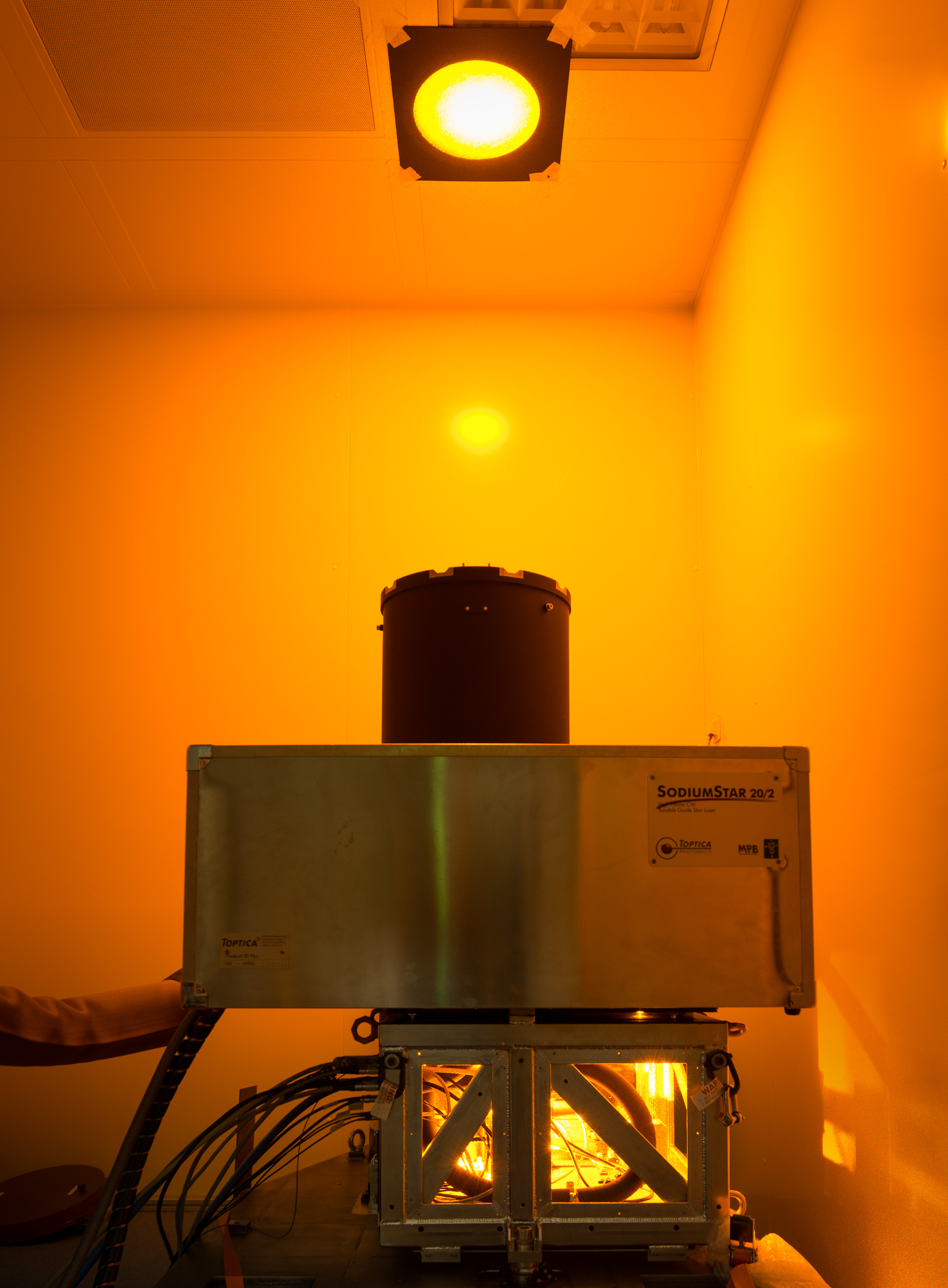
The first 22-watt TOPTICA sodium laser of the Adaptive Optics Facility

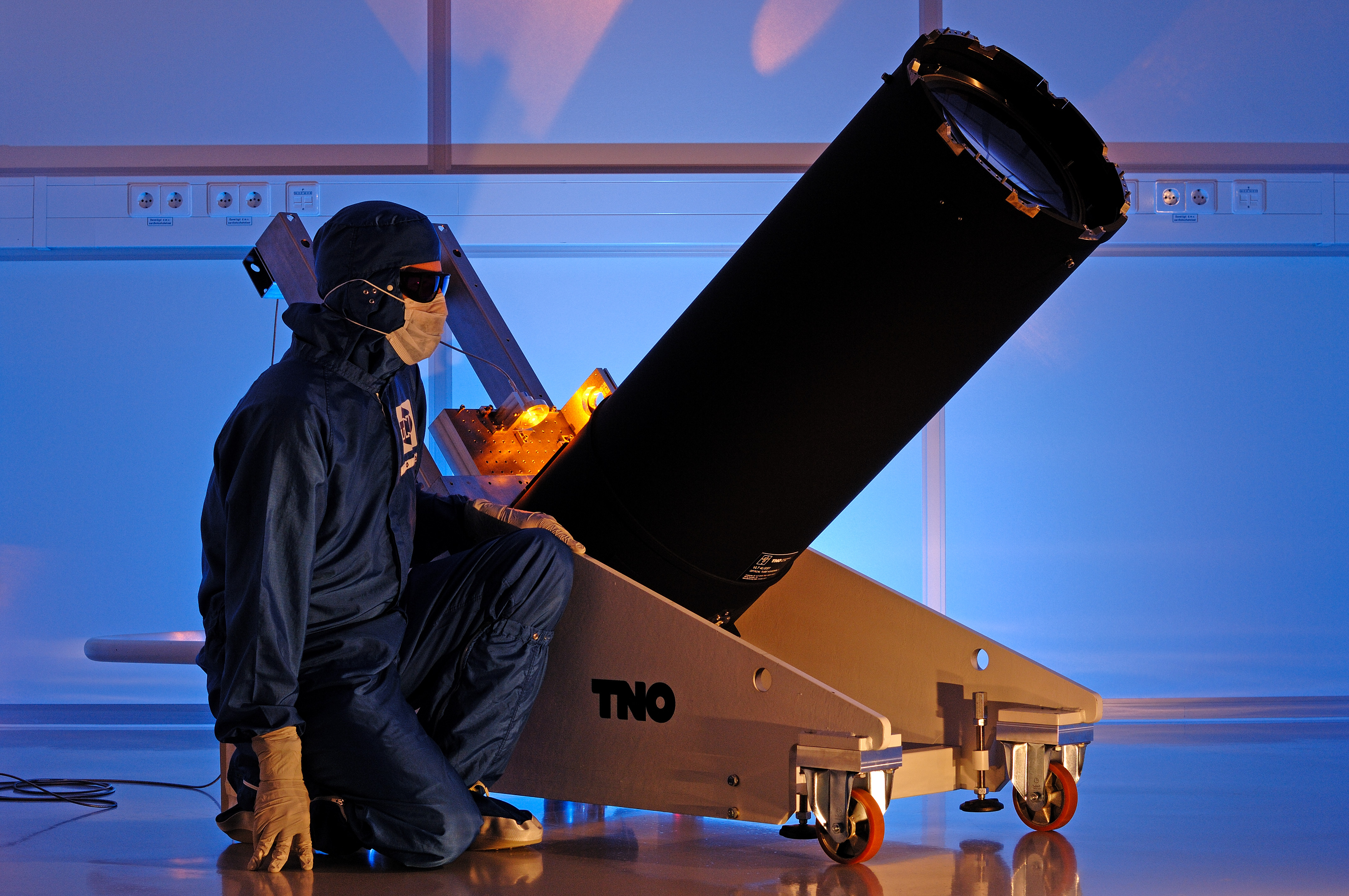
One of the launch telescopes for the VLT Four Laser Guide Star Facility.

There are two main types of laser guide star system, known as sodium and Rayleigh beacon guide stars.

Sodium beacons are created by using a laser tuned to 589.2 nanometers to energize atoms in the sodium layer of the mesosphere at an altitude of around 90 km (56 mi). The sodium atoms then re-emit the laser light, producing a glowing artificial star. The same atomic transition of sodium is used in sodium-vapor lamps for street lighting.

Rayleigh beacons rely on the scattering of light by the molecules in the lower atmosphere. In contrast to sodium beacons, Rayleigh beacons are much simpler and less costly, but do not provide as good a wavefront reference, since the artificial beacon is generated much lower in the atmosphere. The lasers are often pulsed, with measurement of the atmosphere being time-gated (taking place several microseconds after the pulse has been launched, so that scattered light at ground level is ignored and only light that has traveled for several microseconds high up into the atmosphere and back is actually detected).

== Laser development ==
Dye lasers were the first laser sources used in laser guide star applications. These tunable lasers have continued to play a significant role in this field. However, the use of fluid gain media has been considered by some researchers as disadvantageous. Second generation laser sources for sodium guide star applications include sum-frequency-mixed solid-state lasers. New third generation laser systems based on tunable diode lasers with subsequent narrow-band Raman fiber amplification and resonant frequency conversion have been under development since 2005. Since 2014 fully engineered systems are commercially available. Important output features of the tunable lasers mentioned here include diffraction-limited beam divergence and narrow-linewidth emission.

== Progress ==
Example of an artificial reference star.

The sodium laser guide star for use in adaptive optics to correct for atmospheric distortions is believed to have been invented by Princeton physicist Will Happer in 1982, as part of the Strategic Defense Initiative, but it was classified at the time.

Laser guide star adaptive optics is still a very young field, with much effort currently invested in technology development. As of 2006, only two laser guide star AO systems were regularly used for science observations and have contributed to published results in peer-reviewed scientific literature: those at the Lick and Palomar Observatories in California, and the Keck Observatory in Hawaii. However, laser guide star systems were under development at most major telescopes, with the William Herschel Telescope, Very Large Telescope and Gemini North having tested lasers on the sky but not yet achieved regular operations. Other observatories developing laser AO systems as of 2006 include the Large Binocular Telescope and Gran Telescopio Canarias. The laser guide star system at the Very Large Telescope started regular scientific operations in June 2007.

Since April 2016, the 4 Laser Guide Star Facility (4LGSF) has been installed at the ESO's Very Large Telescope (VLT), as a new subsystem of the Adaptive Optics Facility (AOF). The 4LGSF is a complement of the VLT Laser Guide Star Facility (LGSF). Instead of a single laser beam, the 4LGSF propagates four laser beams into the skies of Paranal, in northern Chile, producing four artificial stars by illuminating sodium atoms located in the atmosphere at 90 km altitude. These four stars enable getting a better correction in a specific direction, or widening the field of view corrected by an adaptive optics. Each laser delivers 22 watts in a diameter of 30 cm (12 in). The 4LGSF Laser System is based on a fiber Raman laser technology, developed at ESO and transferred to industry.

The upgrade to four lasers with fiber Raman laser technology is necessary to support the new instruments at Paranal Observatory, like HAWK-I (with GRAAL) and MUSE (with GALACSI). Also with the 4LGSF the stability is increased, the amount of preventative maintenance support and the preparation of an observing run time will be considerably reduced compared to the LGSF, which currently still uses its original dye laser (planned to be replaced by a fiber laser). The 4LGSF helps astronomers to test devices for the E-ELT, which will have a similar system to support the adaptive optics of the telescope. Given its power, the 4LGSF operations follow a protocol to avoid any risk. The laser system is equipped with an automatic aircraft avoidance system that shuts down the lasers if an aircraft ventures too close to the beams.

Since December 2025, the three remaining Unit Telescopes of the Paranal observatory have been equipped with a single laser. It allows to use laser-assisted Adaptive Optics for the Very Large Telescope Interferometer, largely increasing the sensitivity and sky-coverage of the VLTI.

For sodium laser guide stars, there are three main challenges to overcome: Larmor precession, recoil, and transition saturation. Larmor precession, which is the precession of the sodium atom in the geomagnetic field (precisely, it is the precession of the quantized total atomic angular momentum vector of the atom), decreases the atomic fluorescence of the laser guide star by changing the angular momentum of the atom before a two-level cycling transition can be established through optical pumping with circularly polarized light. Recoil from spontaneous emission, resulting in a momentum kick to the atom, causes a redshift in the laser light relative to the atom, rendering the atom unable to absorb the laser light and thus unable to fluoresce. Transition saturation is the depopulation of atoms from a state of higher angular momentum (F=2) to a state of lower angular momentum (F=1), resulting in a different absorption wavelength.
