= Corona Borealis in Chinese astronomy =

Constellation in Chinese astronomy

According to traditional Chinese uranography, the modern constellation Corona Borealis is located in Three Enclosures (三垣, Sān Yuán).

The name of the western constellation in modern Chinese is 北冕座 (běi miǎn zuò), meaning "the northern crown constellation".

== Stars ==
The map of Chinese constellation in constellation Corona Borealis area consists of :

Four Symbols	Mansion (Chinese name)	Romanization	Translation	Asterisms (Chinese name)	Romanization	Translation	Western star name	Proper Name	Chinese star name	Romanization	Translation
Three Enclosures (三垣)	天市垣	Tiān Shì Yuán	Heavenly Market enclosure	貫索	Guànsuǒ	Coiled Thong					
Three Enclosures (三垣)	天市垣	Tiān Shì Yuán	Heavenly Market enclosure	貫索	Guànsuǒ	Coiled Thong	π CrB	Stephanos	貫索一	Guànsuǒyī	1st star
Three Enclosures (三垣)	天市垣	Tiān Shì Yuán	Heavenly Market enclosure	貫索	Guànsuǒ	Coiled Thong	θ CrB	Guansuo	貫索二	Guànsuǒèr	2nd star
Three Enclosures (三垣)	天市垣	Tiān Shì Yuán	Heavenly Market enclosure	貫索	Guànsuǒ	Coiled Thong	β CrB	Nusakan (for component A)	貫索三	Guànsuǒsān	3rd star
Three Enclosures (三垣)	天市垣	Tiān Shì Yuán	Heavenly Market enclosure	貫索	Guànsuǒ	Coiled Thong	α CrB	Alphecca			
Three Enclosures (三垣)	天市垣	Tiān Shì Yuán	Heavenly Market enclosure	貫索	Guànsuǒ	Coiled Thong	α CrB	Alphecca	貫索四	Guànsuǒsì	4th star
Three Enclosures (三垣)	天市垣	Tiān Shì Yuán	Heavenly Market enclosure	貫索	Guànsuǒ	Coiled Thong	α CrB	Alphecca	貫索西南大星	Guànsuǒxīnándàxīng	Big southwestern star
Three Enclosures (三垣)	天市垣	Tiān Shì Yuán	Heavenly Market enclosure	貫索	Guànsuǒ	Coiled Thong	α CrB	Alphecca	外厨大星	Wàichúdàxīng	Big star near Outer Kitchen constellation
Three Enclosures (三垣)	天市垣	Tiān Shì Yuán	Heavenly Market enclosure	貫索	Guànsuǒ	Coiled Thong	γ CrB	Baltesha	貫索五	Guànsuǒwǔ	5th star
Three Enclosures (三垣)	天市垣	Tiān Shì Yuán	Heavenly Market enclosure	貫索	Guànsuǒ	Coiled Thong	δ CrB	Matrichakra	貫索六	Guànsuǒliù	6th star
Three Enclosures (三垣)	天市垣	Tiān Shì Yuán	Heavenly Market enclosure	貫索	Guànsuǒ	Coiled Thong	ε CrB		貫索七	Guànsuǒqī	7th star
Three Enclosures (三垣)	天市垣	Tiān Shì Yuán	Heavenly Market enclosure	貫索	Guànsuǒ	Coiled Thong	ι CrB	Aurwandilsta	貫索八	Guànsuǒbā	8th star
Three Enclosures (三垣)	天市垣	Tiān Shì Yuán	Heavenly Market enclosure	貫索	Guànsuǒ	Coiled Thong	ρ CrB		貫索九	Guànsuǒjiǔ	9th star
Three Enclosures (三垣)	天市垣	Tiān Shì Yuán	Heavenly Market enclosure	貫索	Guànsuǒ	Coiled Thong	ο CrB		貫索增二	Guànsuǒzēngèr	2nd additional star
Three Enclosures (三垣)	天市垣	Tiān Shì Yuán	Heavenly Market enclosure	貫索	Guànsuǒ	Coiled Thong	η CrB		貫索增三	Guànsuǒzēngsān	3rd additional star
Three Enclosures (三垣)	天市垣	Tiān Shì Yuán	Heavenly Market enclosure	貫索	Guànsuǒ	Coiled Thong	κ CrB		貫索增四	Guànsuǒzēngsì	4th additional star
Three Enclosures (三垣)	天市垣	Tiān Shì Yuán	Heavenly Market enclosure	貫索	Guànsuǒ	Coiled Thong	λ CrB		貫索增五	Guànsuǒzēngwǔ	5th additional star
Three Enclosures (三垣)	天市垣	Tiān Shì Yuán	Heavenly Market enclosure	貫索	Guànsuǒ	Coiled Thong	τ CrB		貫索增六	Guànsuǒzēngliù	6th additional star
Three Enclosures (三垣)	天市垣	Tiān Shì Yuán	Heavenly Market enclosure	貫索	Guànsuǒ	Coiled Thong	σ CrB		貫索增七	Guànsuǒzēngqī	7th additional star
Three Enclosures (三垣)	天市垣	Tiān Shì Yuán	Heavenly Market enclosure	貫索	Guànsuǒ	Coiled Thong	υ CrB		貫索增八	Guànsuǒzēngbā	8th additional star
Three Enclosures (三垣)	天市垣	Tiān Shì Yuán	Heavenly Market enclosure	天紀	Tiānjì	Celestial Discipline					
Three Enclosures (三垣)	天市垣	Tiān Shì Yuán	Heavenly Market enclosure	天紀	Tiānjì	Celestial Discipline	ξ CrB		天紀一	Tiānjìyī	1st star
Three Enclosures (三垣)	天市垣	Tiān Shì Yuán	Heavenly Market enclosure	天紀	Tiānjì	Celestial Discipline	ν^{2} CrB		天紀增三	Tiānjìzēngsān	3rd additional star
Three Enclosures (三垣)	天市垣	Tiān Shì Yuán	Heavenly Market enclosure	天紀	Tiānjì	Celestial Discipline	23 Her		天紀增四	Tiānjìzēngsì	4th additional star
Three Enclosures (三垣)	天市垣	Tiān Shì Yuán	Heavenly Market enclosure	七公	Qīgōng	Seven Excellencies					
Three Enclosures (三垣)	天市垣	Tiān Shì Yuán	Heavenly Market enclosure	七公	Qīgōng	Seven Excellencies	ζ CrB		七公增七	Qīgōngzēngqī	7th additional star
Three Enclosures (三垣)	天市垣	Tiān Shì Yuán	Heavenly Market enclosure	七公	Qīgōng	Seven Excellencies	μ CrB		七公增八	Qīgōngzēngbā	8th additional star

== See also ==
- Traditional Chinese star names
- Chinese constellations
