= List of stars in Corona Borealis =

This is the list of notable stars in the constellation Corona Borealis, sorted by decreasing brightness.

Name	B	F	Var	HD	HIP	RA	Dec	vis. mag.	abs. mag.	Dist. (ly)	Sp. class	Notes
α CrB	α	5		139006	76267	15^{h} 34^{m} 41.19^{s}	+26° 42′ 53.7″	2.22	0.42	75	A0V	Alphecca, Alphacca, Alphekka, Gemma, Gnosia, Gnosia Stella Coronae, Asteroth, Ashtaroth; Algol variable
β CrB	β	3		137909	75695	15^{h} 27^{m} 49.85^{s}	+29° 06′ 19.8″	3.66	0.94	114	F0p	Nusakan; α² CVn variable, V_{max} = 3.65^{m}, V_{min} = 3.72^{m}, P = 18.487 d
γ CrB	γ	8		140436	76952	15^{h} 42^{m} 44.64^{s}	+26° 17′ 43.9″	3.81	0.57	145	A1Vs	Baltesha (A), δ Sct variable, V_{max} = 3.8^{m}, V_{min} = 3.86^{m}, P = 0.03 d
θ CrB	θ	4		138749	76127	15^{h} 32^{m} 55.80^{s}	+31° 21′ 33.0″	4.14	−0.76	311	B6Vnn	Guansuo (A), Be star, V_{max} = 4.06^{m}, V_{min} = 4.33^{m}
ε CrB	ε	13		143107	78159	15^{h} 57^{m} 35.30^{s}	+26° 52′ 40.9″	4.14	−0.10	230	K3III	has a planet (b)
δ CrB	δ	10		141714	77512	15^{h} 49^{m} 35.70^{s}	+26° 04′ 06.8″	4.59	1.06	165	G5III-IV	Matrichakra, RS CVn variable, V_{max} = 4.57^{m}, V_{min} = 4.69^{m}
ζ CrB	ζ	7		139891	76669	15^{h} 39^{m} 22.68^{s}	+36° 38′ 09.0″	4.64	−1.17	473	B7V+...	ζ^{2}, a spectroscopic triple, is 6" from ζ^{1}
τ CrB	τ	16		145328	79119	16^{h} 08^{m} 58.33^{s}	+36° 29′ 24.4″	4.73	2.03	113	K0III-IV	suspected variable, V_{max} = 4.72^{m}, V_{min} = 4.82^{m}
κ CrB	κ	11		142091	77655	15^{h} 51^{m} 13.94^{s}	+35° 39′ 29.6″	4.79	2.32	101	K0III-IV	has a planet (b)
ξ CrB	ξ	19		147677	80181	16^{h} 22^{m} 05.89^{s}	+30° 53′ 30.2″	4.86	1.11	184	K0III	suspected variable
ι CrB	ι	14		143807	78493	16^{h} 01^{m} 26.59^{s}	+29° 51′ 03.9″	4.98	−0.18	351	A0p...	Aurwandilsta, suspected α^{2} CVn variable, V_{max} = 4.96^{m}, V_{min} = 5.08^{m}
η CrB A	η	2		137107	75312	15^{h} 23^{m} 12.23^{s}	+30° 17′ 17.7″	4.99	3.64	61	G2V	double star; suspected variable, V_{max} = 4.94^{m}, V_{min} = 5.02^{m}
μ CrB	μ	6		139153	76307	15^{h} 35^{m} 14.90^{s}	+39° 00′ 36.2″	5.14	−1.08	571	M2III	variable star, ΔV = 0.015^{m}, P = 40.73320 d
ν^{1} CrB	ν^{1}	20		147749	80197	16^{h} 22^{m} 21.42^{s}	+33° 47′ 56.9″	5.20	−0.96	555	M2III	variable star, ΔV = 0.011^{m}, P = 4.41014 d
ρ CrB	ρ	15		143761	78459	16^{h} 01^{m} 02.80^{s}	+33° 18′ 19.4″	5.39	4.18	57	G2V	has a companion, has two planets (b & c), now thought to be a low-mass star.
ν^{2} CrB	ν^{2}	21		147767	80214	16^{h} 22^{m} 29.22^{s}	+33° 42′ 12.1″	5.40	−0.72	545	K5III	suspected variable
λ CrB	λ	12		142908	78012	15^{h} 55^{m} 47.57^{s}	+37° 56′ 48.3″	5.43	2.34	135	F0IV	suspected variable, V_{max} = 5.37^{m}, V_{min} = 5.44^{m}
ο CrB	ο	1		136512	75049	15^{h} 20^{m} 08.64^{s}	+29° 36′ 58.7″	5.51	0.89	274	K0III	has a planet (b)
σ CrB A	σ^{2}	17	TZ	146361	79607	16^{h} 14^{m} 41.04^{s}	+33° 51′ 31.8″	5.56	3.78	71	F8V	RS CVn variable, V_{max} = 5.54^{m}, V_{min} = 5.69^{m}, P = 1.1397912 d
π CrB	π	9		140716	77048	15^{h} 43^{m} 59.32^{s}	+32° 30′ 57.0″	5.57	1.16	249	G9III:	Stephanos
HD 143435				143435	78276	15^{h} 58^{m} 57.70^{s}	+36° 38′ 37.3″	5.61	−1.59	898	K5III	suspected variable
HD 145849				145849	79358	16^{h} 11^{m} 48.06^{s}	+36° 25′ 30.6″	5.62	−0.74	610	K3III SB	
HD 144208				144208	78649	16^{h} 03^{m} 19.36^{s}	+36° 37′ 54.6″	5.79	−0.84	691	A2V+...	
υ CrB	υ	18		146738	79757	16^{h} 16^{m} 44.77^{s}	+29° 09′ 01.1″	5.80	−1.22	825	A3V	suspected variable, V_{max} = 5.78^{m}, V_{min} = 5.88^{m}
R CrB			R	141527	77442	15^{h} 48^{m} 34.42^{s}	+28° 09′ 24.4″	5.89	−5.45	6037	C0,0 (F8pe)	prototype R CrB variable, V_{max} = 5.71^{m}, V_{min} = 15.2^{m}
η CrB B	η	2		137108		15^{h} 23^{m} 12.30^{s}	+30° 17′ 16.0″	6.08				component of the η CrB system
HD 139761				139761	76617	15^{h} 38^{m} 48.86^{s}	+34° 40′ 30.3″	6.12	0.37	460	K0	
HD 146537				146537	79686	16^{h} 15^{m} 47.34^{s}	+27° 25′ 19.8″	6.14	0.48	442	K2	
HD 139284				139284	76366	15^{h} 35^{m} 49.19^{s}	+38° 22′ 26.2″	6.30	−0.31	683	K2	
HD 145802				145802	79350	16^{h} 11^{m} 39.60^{s}	+33° 20′ 33.8″	6.30	0.31	515	K2III	suspected variable
HD 136403				136403	75000	15^{h} 19^{m} 30.07^{s}	+32° 30′ 53.6″	6.33	1.67	278	A2m	
HD 138525				138525	76006	15^{h} 31^{m} 22.31^{s}	+36° 37′ 00.0″	6.39	2.19	225	F6III	
HD 145957				145957	79385	16^{h} 12^{m} 06.55^{s}	+39° 03′ 20.1″	6.39	−0.73	867	K0	
HD 141456				141456	77397	15^{h} 48^{m} 01.79^{s}	+31° 44′ 08.6″	6.41	−0.60	823	K5	variable star, ΔV = 0.008^{m}, P = 9.14829 d
23 Her		(23)		147835	80247	16^{h} 22^{m} 56.48^{s}	+32° 19′ 58.9″	6.41	0.42	515	A4Vn	
HD 138341				138341	75919	15^{h} 30^{m} 22.78^{s}	+31° 17′ 09.5″	6.45	0.70	460	A4IV	
HD 139389				139389	76456	15^{h} 36^{m} 53.37^{s}	+29° 59′ 28.8″	6.46	3.68	117	F5V:	
HD 145976				145976	79441	16^{h} 12^{m} 45.43^{s}	+26° 40′ 14.4″	6.48	2.16	238	F3V	
HD 145457				145457	79219	16^{h} 10^{m} 03.91^{s}	+26° 44′ 33.9″	6.57	1.06	411	K0III	Kamuy, has a planet (b)
σ CrB B	σ^{1}	17		146362		16^{h} 14^{m} 40.80^{s}	+33° 51′ 30.0″	6.66				component of the σ CrB system
S CrB			S	136753	75143	15^{h} 21^{m} 23.80^{s}	+31° 22′ 02.0″	7.15		1762	M6.5-8e	Mira variable, V_{max} = 5.8^{m}, V_{min} = 14.1^{m}, P = 360.26 d
RS CrB			RS	143347	78235	15^{h} 58^{m} 30.76^{s}	+36° 01′ 19.7″	7.44		1070	M7	semiregular variable
ADS 9731				139691	76563	15^{h} 38^{m} 12.91^{s}	+38° 16′ 48.6″	7.80		349	F5+F5	6-star system
V CrB			V	141826	77501	15^{h} 49^{m} 31.31^{s}	+39° 34′ 17.91″	7.83		8800	C6,2e	Algol variable, V_{max} = 6.9^{m}, V_{min} = 12.6^{m}, P = 357.63 d
U CrB			U	136175	74881	15^{h} 18^{m} 11.35^{s}	+31° 38′ 49.4″	7.83		811	B6V+F8III-IV	Algol variable, V_{max} = 7.66^{m}, V_{min} = 8.79^{m}, P = 3.45220133 d
HD 140913				140913	77152	15^{h} 43^{m} 07.45^{s}	+28° 28′ 11.8″	8.07		143.1	G0V	solar twin with brown dwarf companion
RR CrB			RR	140297	76844	15^{h} 41^{m} 26.23^{s}	+38° 33′ 26.6″	8.20		1110	M3	semiregular variable, V_{max} = 7.3^{m}, V_{min} = 8.2^{m}, P = 60.8 d
YY CrB			YY	141990	77598	15^{h} 50^{m} 32.43^{s}	+37° 50′ 07.6″	8.69		301	F8V	V_{max} = 8.61^{m}, V_{min} = 9.12^{m}, P = 0.38 d
RT CrB			RT	139588	76551	15^{h} 38^{m} 03.03^{s}	+29° 29′ 13.9″	10.22			G0	RS CVn variable, V_{max} = 10.2^{m}, V_{min} = 10.82^{m}, P = 5.117159 d
RW CrB			RW	139815	76658	15^{h} 39^{m} 15.23^{s}	+29° 37′ 19.6″	10.22		679	A8Vv	Algol variable, V_{max} = 10.22^{m}, V_{min} = 10.78^{m}, P = 0.7264114 d
TW CrB			TW			16^{h} 06^{m} 50.70^{s}	+27° 16′ 34.6″	10.49			F8	Algol variable, V_{max} = 10.3^{m}, V_{min} = 11.3^{m}, P = 0.58887584 d
T CrB			T	143454	78322	15^{h} 59^{m} 30.16^{s}	+25° 55′ 12.6″	10.6		3500	M3III+p	"Blaze Star"; recurrent nova and rotating ellipsoidal variable, V_{max} = 2.0^{m}, V_{min} = 10.8^{m}, P = 227.6 d
BD +33 2642					77716	15^{h} 51^{m} 59.89^{s}	+32° 56′ 54.3″	10.73		33000	B2IVp	protoplanetary nebula
XO-1						16^{h} 02^{m} 11.84^{s}	+28° 10′ 10.43″	11.30		652		Moldoveanu; has the transiting planet XO-1b
UW CrB			UW			16^{h} 05^{m} 45.87^{s}	+25° 51′ 45.17″	19.7				Low-mass X-ray binary
Table legend: • Name = Proper name • B = Bayer designation • F or/and G. = Flamsteed designation or Gould designation • Var = Variable star designation • HD = Henry Draper Catalogue designation number • HIP = Hipparcos Catalogue designation number • RA = Right ascension for the Epoch/Equinox J2000.0 • Dec = Declination for the Epoch/Equinox J2000.0 • vis. mag. = visual magnitude (m or m_{v}), also known as apparent magnitude • abs. mag. = absolute magnitude (M_{v}) • Dist. (ly) = Distance in light-years from Earth • Sp. class = Spectral class of the star in the stellar classification system • Notes = Common name(s) or alternate name(s); comments; notable properties [for example: multiple star status, range of variability if it is a variable star, exoplanets, etc.]

== See also ==
- List of stars by constellation
