= Alpha Coronae Borealis =

Binary star in the constellation Corona Borealis

- Location of α Coronae Borealis (circled)

Observation data Epoch J2000 Equinox ICRS
- Constellation: Corona Borealis
- Right ascension: 15^{h} 34^{m} 41.268^{s}
- Declination: +26° 42′ 52.89″
- Apparent magnitude (V): 2.24

Characteristics
- Evolutionary stage: main sequence
- Spectral type: A0V + G5V
- U−B color index: −0.03
- B−V color index: −0.02
- Variable type: eclipsing binary

Astrometry
Radial velocity (R_{v})	+1.7 km/s
Proper motion (μ)	RA: 120.27 mas/yr Dec.: −89.58 mas/yr
Parallax (π)	43.46±0.28 mas
Distance	75.0 ± 0.5 ly (23.0 ± 0.1 pc)
Absolute magnitude (M_{V})	+0.16/+5.05

Orbit
Period (P)	17.3599 d
Semi-major axis (a)	0.19379(50) AU
Eccentricity (e)	0.3794(19)
Inclination (i)	88.2°
Periastron epoch (T)	56,646±0 (JD)
Argument of periastron (ω) (secondary)	312.32±0.43°
Semi-amplitude (K_{1}) (primary)	36.22±0.13 km/s
Semi-amplitude (K_{2}) (secondary)	98.02±0.33 km/s

Details

α CrB A
Mass	2.581±0.045 M_{☉}
Radius	3.059±0.302 R_{☉}
Luminosity	74 L_{☉}
Surface gravity (log g)	3.879±0.096 cgs
Temperature	9,700±200 K
Rotational velocity (v sin i)	139 km/s
Age	400 Myr

α CrB B
Mass	0.922±0.025 M_{☉}
Radius	0.906±0.040 R_{☉}
Luminosity	0.83 L_{☉}
Surface gravity (log g)	4.489±0.042 cgs
Temperature	5,800±300 K
Rotational velocity (v sin i)	< 14 km/s

Other designations
- Gemma, Alphecca, Ashtaroth, Gnosia Stella Coronae, 5 CrB, BD+27°2512, FK5 578, HD 139006, HIP 76267, HR 5793, SAO 83893

Database references
SIMBAD	data

Alpha Coronae Borealis is an eclipsing binary star system in the northern constellation of Corona Borealis. It has the official name Alphecca, pronounced /ælˈfɛkə/; Alpha Coronae Borealis is its Bayer designation. This star is located about 75 light years from the Sun and contains two main sequence stars, one class A and one class G.

== Properties ==
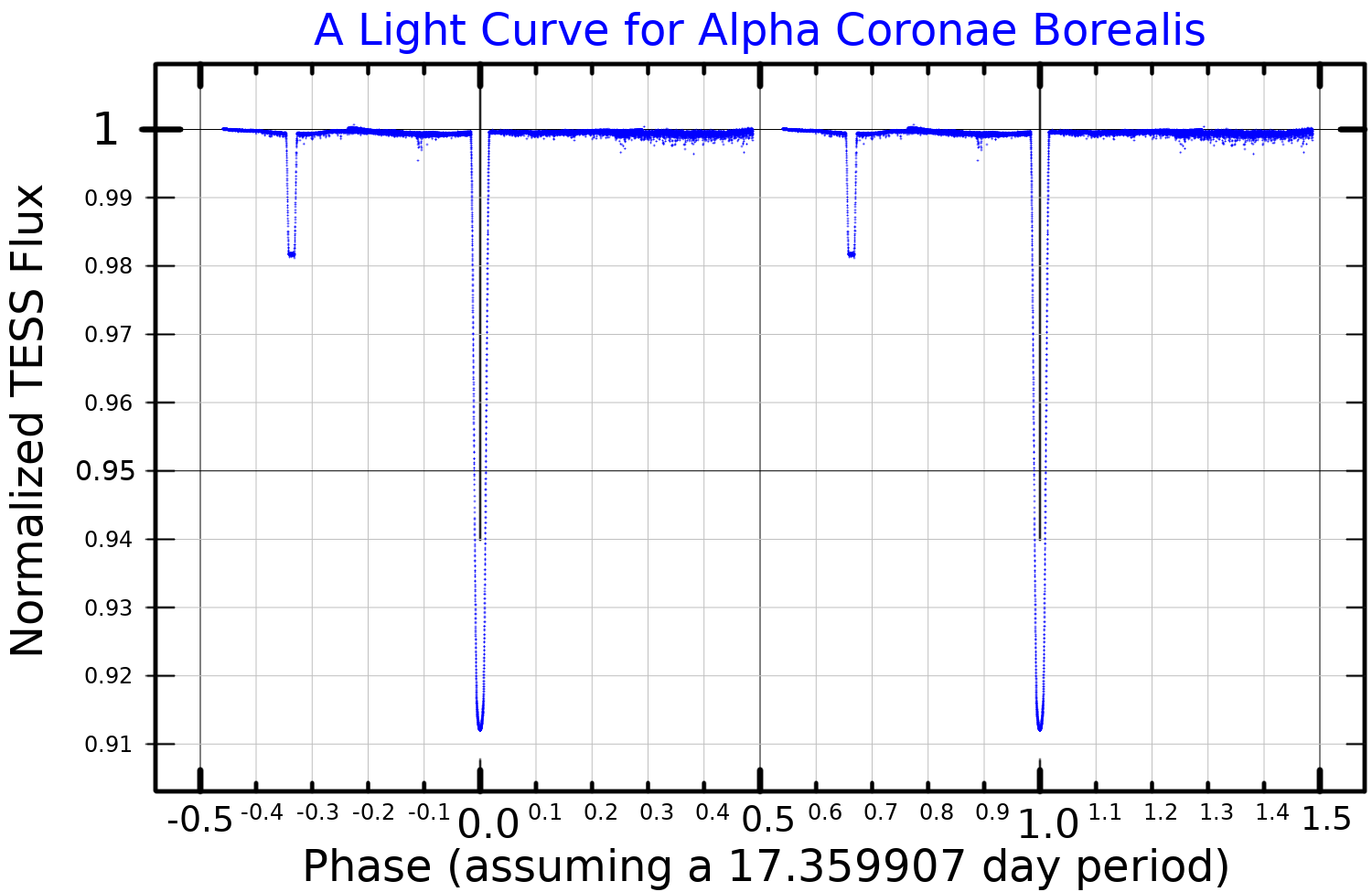
A light curve for Alpha Coronae Borealis, plotted from TESS data

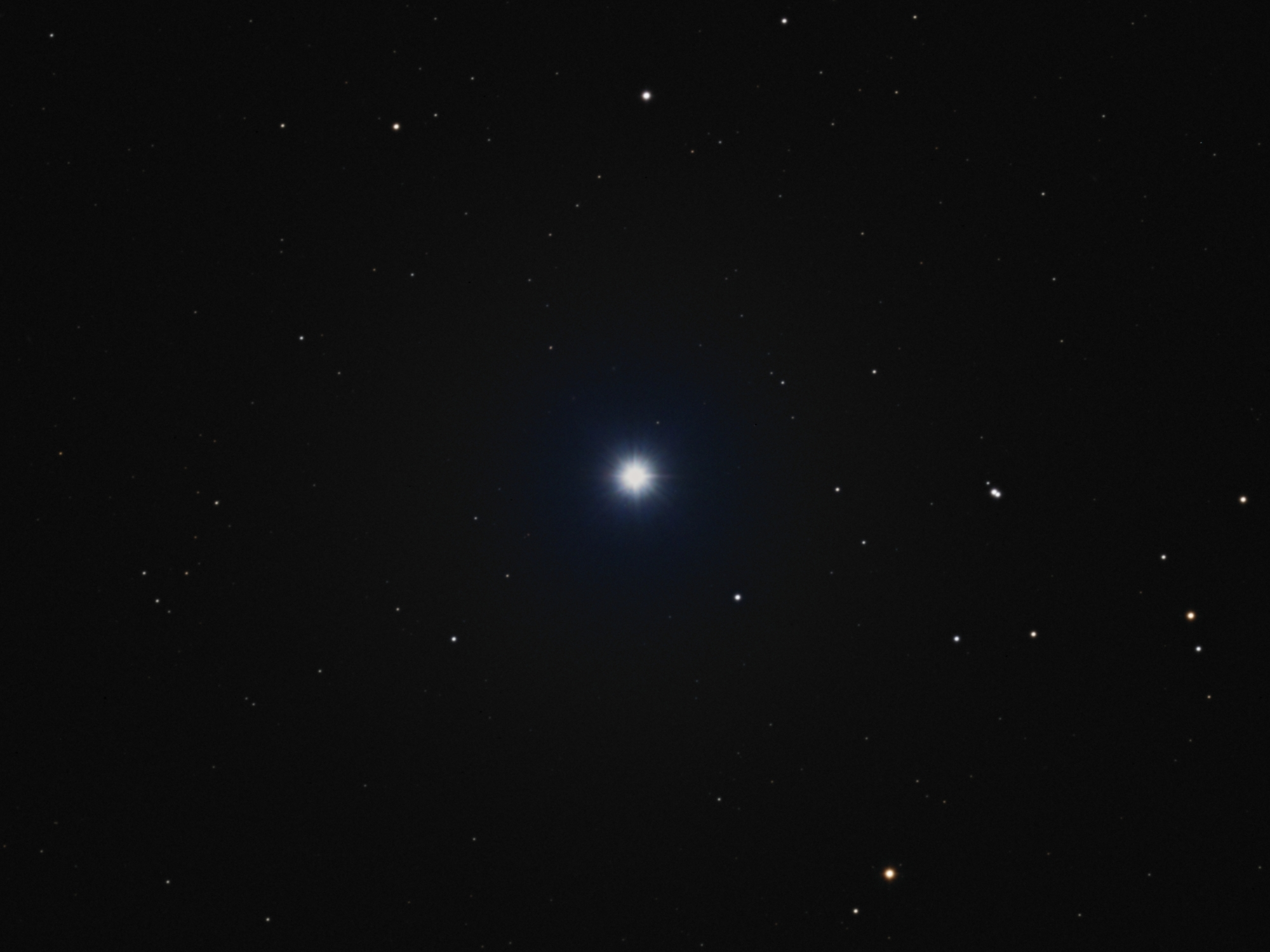
α Coronae Borealis in optical light

Alpha Coronae Borealis is a binary system, its stars orbiting each other in an eccentric orbit every 17.36 days. Because the plane of this orbit is inclined at an angle of 88.2° to the line of sight to the Earth, the pair form a detached eclipsing binary system similar to Algol (β Per). The periodic eclipses result in a magnitude variation of +2.21 to +2.32, which is hardly noticeable to the unaided eye.

The primary component is a white main sequence star that has a stellar classification of A0V and 2.6 times the mass of the Sun. Estimates of the star's radius range from 2.89 to 3.04 times the radius of the Sun. An excess of infrared radiation at 24 μm and 70 μm has been detected about the primary star by the IRAS. This suggests the presence of a large disc of dust and material around the star, prompting speculation of a planetary or proto-planetary system similar to that currently assumed around Vega. The disk extends out to a radius of around 60 astronomical units (AU).

The secondary component is a yellow main sequence star with an estimated stellar class of G5, 0.92 times the Sun's mass and 0.90 times the Sun's radius. The X-ray luminosity of this star is 6 × 10^{28} erg s^{−1}, which is 30 times greater than the peak activity level of the Sun. This higher activity level is expected for a young star of this class. The corona has a temperature of about 5 MK, which is much hotter than the Sun's corona. The upper limit of 14 km/s for the equatorial rotation velocity is equivalent to a rotation period of 3 days. More likely, the rotation period is 7–9 days.

The space velocity components of this star system are U = +14.257, V = +0.915 and W = +3.147 km/s. α CrB is believed to be a member of the Ursa Major Moving Group of stars that have a common motion through space.

== Nomenclature ==
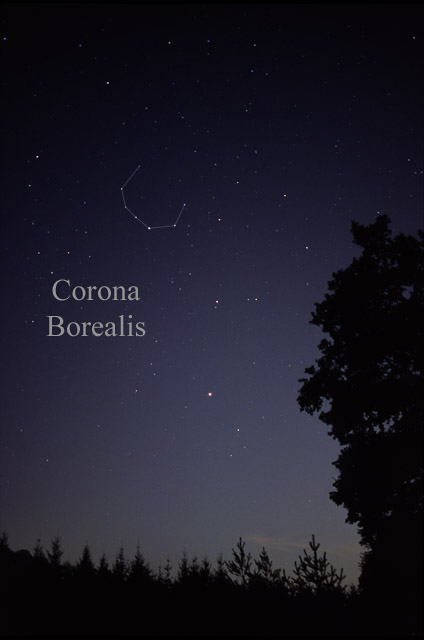
α CrB, the brightest star in Corona Borealis

α Coronae Borealis, which is Latinised to Alpha Coronae Borealis, is the star's Bayer designation, and is abbreviated Alpha CrB or α CrB.

It bore the traditional names Alphecca, Gemma, and Gnosia Stella Coronae. Alphecca is Arabic, short for نير الفكّة nayyir al-fakka "the bright (star) of the broken (ring of stars)". Gemma is Latin for "jewel". Also Latin in origin is Gnosia Stella Coronae "Cretan star of the Crown" (specifically from Vergil's Georgics), from Gnōsus or Gnōsos ("Knossos"), referencing the birthplace of Ariadne, whose wedding diadem became in some myths the constellation of Corona Borealis, following her marriage to Bacchus. As the brightest star in Corona Borealis, it lent its name to Alphekka Meridiana, the brightest in the constellation of Corona Australis. The International Astronomical Union Working Group on Star Names (WGSN) has chosen Alphecca as the formal name for this star.

The term nayyir al-fakka or Nir al Feccah appeared in the Al Achsasi Al Mouakket catalogue.

In Chinese, 貫索 (Guàn Suǒ), meaning Coiled Thong, refers to an asterism consisting of Alpha Coronae Borealis, Pi Coronae Borealis, Theta Coronae Borealis, Beta Coronae Borealis, Gamma Coronae Borealis, Delta Coronae Borealis, Epsilon Coronae Borealis, Iota Coronae Borealis and Rho Coronae Borealis. Consequently, the Chinese name for Alpha Coronae Borealis itself is 貫索四 (Guàn Suǒ sì, English: the Fourth Star of Coiled Thong.).

== In culture ==
Under the name Alphecca, this is one of the medieval Behenian fixed stars.
