= Sigma Coronae Borealis =

Star in the constellation Corona Borealis

- Location of σ Coronae Borealis (circled)

Observation data Epoch J2000 Equinox ICRS
- Constellation: Corona Borealis
- σ CrB A (σ^{2})
- Right ascension: 16^{h} 14^{m} 40.853^{s}
- Declination: +33° 51′ 31.01″
- Apparent magnitude (V): 5.55
- σ CrB B (σ^{1})
- Right ascension: 16^{h} 14^{m} 40.387^{s}
- Declination: +33° 51′ 27.10″
- Apparent magnitude (V): 6.419
- σ CrB C
- Right ascension: 16^{h} 13^{m} 56.268^{s}
- Declination: +33° 46′ 24.10″
- Apparent magnitude (V): 12.229

Characteristics

σ CrB
- Spectral type: F6V (A) + G1V (B)
- U−B color index: +0.045
- B−V color index: +0.599
- Variable type: RS CVn

σ CrB C
- Spectral type: M2.5V

Astrometry

σ CrB A
Radial velocity (R_{v})	−12.30±0.06 km/s
Proper motion (μ)	RA: −268.216 mas/yr Dec.: −87.282 mas/yr
Parallax (π)	44.0575±0.0459 mas
Distance	74.03 ± 0.08 ly (22.70 ± 0.02 pc)
Absolute magnitude (M_{V})	+4.02

σ CrB B
Radial velocity (R_{v})	−12.30±0.06 km/s
Proper motion (μ)	RA: −290.860 mas/yr Dec.: −78.524 mas/yr
Parallax (π)	44.1340±0.0179 mas
Distance	73.90 ± 0.03 ly (22.658 ± 0.009 pc)
Absolute magnitude (M_{V})	+4.64

σ CrB C
Radial velocity (R_{v})	−16.30±10 km/s
Proper motion (μ)	RA: −286.965 mas/yr Dec.: −89.818 mas/yr
Parallax (π)	44.2674±0.1586 mas
Distance	73.7 ± 0.3 ly (22.59 ± 0.08 pc)
Absolute magnitude (M_{V})	+10.41

Orbit
Primary	σ^{2} CrB primary
Name	σ^{2} CrB secondary
Period (P)	1.139791423(80) days
Semi-major axis (a)	1.225±0.013 mas
Eccentricity (e)	0.0
Inclination (i)	28.08±0.34°
Longitude of the node (Ω)	207.93±0.67°
Periastron epoch (T)	2450127.61845(20)
Argument of periastron (ω) (secondary)	0.0°

Orbit
Primary	σ^{2} CrB
Name	σ^{1} CrB
Period (P)	726±62 yr
Semi-major axis (a)	5.26±0.35″
Eccentricity (e)	0.72±0.01
Inclination (i)	32.3±4.1°
Longitude of the node (Ω)	28.0±0.5°
Periastron epoch (T)	B 1825.2±1.5
Argument of periastron (ω) (primary)	237.3±6.8°

Orbit
Primary	σ CrB Ca
Name	σ CrB Cb
Period (P)	52 yr
Semi-major axis (a)	0.111″
Eccentricity (e)	0.36
Inclination (i)	59°
Longitude of the node (Ω)	30°
Periastron epoch (T)	B 1963.0
Argument of periastron (ω) (secondary)	127°

Details

σ^{2} CrB primary (Aa)
Mass	1.137±0.037 M_{☉}
Radius	1.244±0.050 R_{☉}
Surface gravity (log g)	4.5 cgs
Temperature	6,050±150 K
Metallicity [Fe/H]	0.0 dex
Rotational velocity (v sin i)	26±1 km/s
Age	0.5 to 1.5 Gyr

σ^{2} CrB secondary (Ab)
Mass	1.090±0.036 M_{☉}
Radius	1.244±0.050 R_{☉}
Surface gravity (log g)	4.5 cgs
Temperature	5,870±150 K
Metallicity [Fe/H]	0.0 dex
Rotational velocity (v sin i)	26±1 km/s
Age	0.5 to 1.5 Gyr

σ^{1} CrB (B)
Mass	1.0 M_{☉}
Radius	1.020±0.001 R_{☉}
Surface gravity (log g)	4.5 cgs
Temperature	5,950±100 K
Rotational velocity (v sin i)	3±2 km/s
Age	1 to 3 Myr

σ CrB Ca
Mass	0.423±0.042 M_{☉}
Radius	0.437±0.020 R_{☉}
Surface gravity (log g)	5.0 cgs
Temperature	3,454±63 K
Metallicity [Fe/H]	−0.06±0.03 dex
Age	2.95 Gyr

Other designations
- σ CrB, 17 CrB, BD+34°2750, GJ 605.2, SAO 65165, ADS 9979, CCDM J16147+3352, WDS J16147+3352
- σ CrB A: σ^{2} CrB, TZ CrB, GJ 9550A, HD 146361, HIP 79607A, HR 6063, TYC 2583-1846-1
- σ CrB B: σ^{1} CrB, GJ 9550B, HD 146362, HIP 79607B, HR 6064, TYC 2583-1846-2
- σ CrB C: GJ 9549, HIP 79551, G 180-42

Database references
SIMBAD	σ CrB
- σ^{1} CrB
- σ^{2} CrB
- σ CrB C
ARICNS	σ^{1} CrB
- σ^{2} CrB
- σ CrB C

Sigma Coronae Borealis is a multiple star system in the northern constellation of Corona Borealis. Its name is a Bayer designation that is Latinized from σ Coronae Borealis and abbreviated Sigma CrB or σ CrB. This is a quintuple star system containing three sunlike main-sequence stars and two other low-mass stars. The combined visual magnitude is 5.3 and the system lies 74 light years from Earth. σ CrB A is the variable star TZ Coronae Borealis.

== System components ==
Aa
Period = 1.14 d
Ab
Period = 726 yr
B (σ^{1})
Period = 877,000 yr
Ca
Period = 52 yr
Cb

Hierarchy of orbits

The brightest components of Sigma Coronae Borealis form a visual binary with an angular separation of 7 arcsecond first resolved in the 19th century, and are designated σ Corona Borealis A and B. More recently, the designations σ^{2} and σ^{1} Corona Borealis have come into use. Somewhat confusingly, the brighter component A is referred to as σ^{2} because it has the higher right ascension. A third component, while being separated by 635″ (translating to a minimum distance of 14,000 au), has a similar parallax and proper motion to the brighter stars and is physically associated. It is known in the Washington Double Star Catalog (WDS), a compilation of observations of double stars, as component E, but it is usually called Sigma Coronae Borealis C.

Sigma^{1} Corona Borealis is a G-type main-sequence star like the Sun, and has similar parameters: a mass roughly equal to that of the Sun, and an effective temperature of 5950 K. A visual orbit has been calculated, with a period of about 730 years and a high eccentricity of 0.72.

Sigma^{2} Corona Borealis itself is a close binary. Here, the two stars are extremely close and orbit fairly quickly, every 1.14 days. This tiny separation of only 0.0279 au has allowed the two stars to exert tidal forces on each other, leading to synchronization of their rotation. They have also been classified as RS Canum Venaticorum variables (RS CVn)—young, active stars that show variability in their apparent magnitude due to starspots on their surfaces.

Despite Sigma^{2} Corona Borealis's two stars being separated only by about the diameter of each star, they were resolved using the CHARA optical interferometer at the Mount Wilson Observatory. As of 2006, it is the shortest-period binary ever to be resolved. The primary is 13.7% more massive than the Sun, while the secondary is 9.0% more massive than the Sun, and both are 24.4% wider than the Sun.

σ Coronae Borealis C, also known as HIP 79551, appears as a red dwarf with a spectral type of M2.5V. It too is a binary star, with a companion in a 52-year orbit. The companion has a mass of 0.10 M_{☉} and has been detected through astrometry.

== Optical companions ==
The Washington Double Star Catalog (WDS), a compilation of observations of double stars, lists several components to the main system. Two of those are listed in the WDS as components C, and D. As of 1984, component C was separated from the primary by 18″ along a position angle of 103° and as of 1996, component D was separated from the primary by 88″ along a position angle of 82°. However, both of them have different proper motions through space and are not related, just optical alignments.

== Variability ==
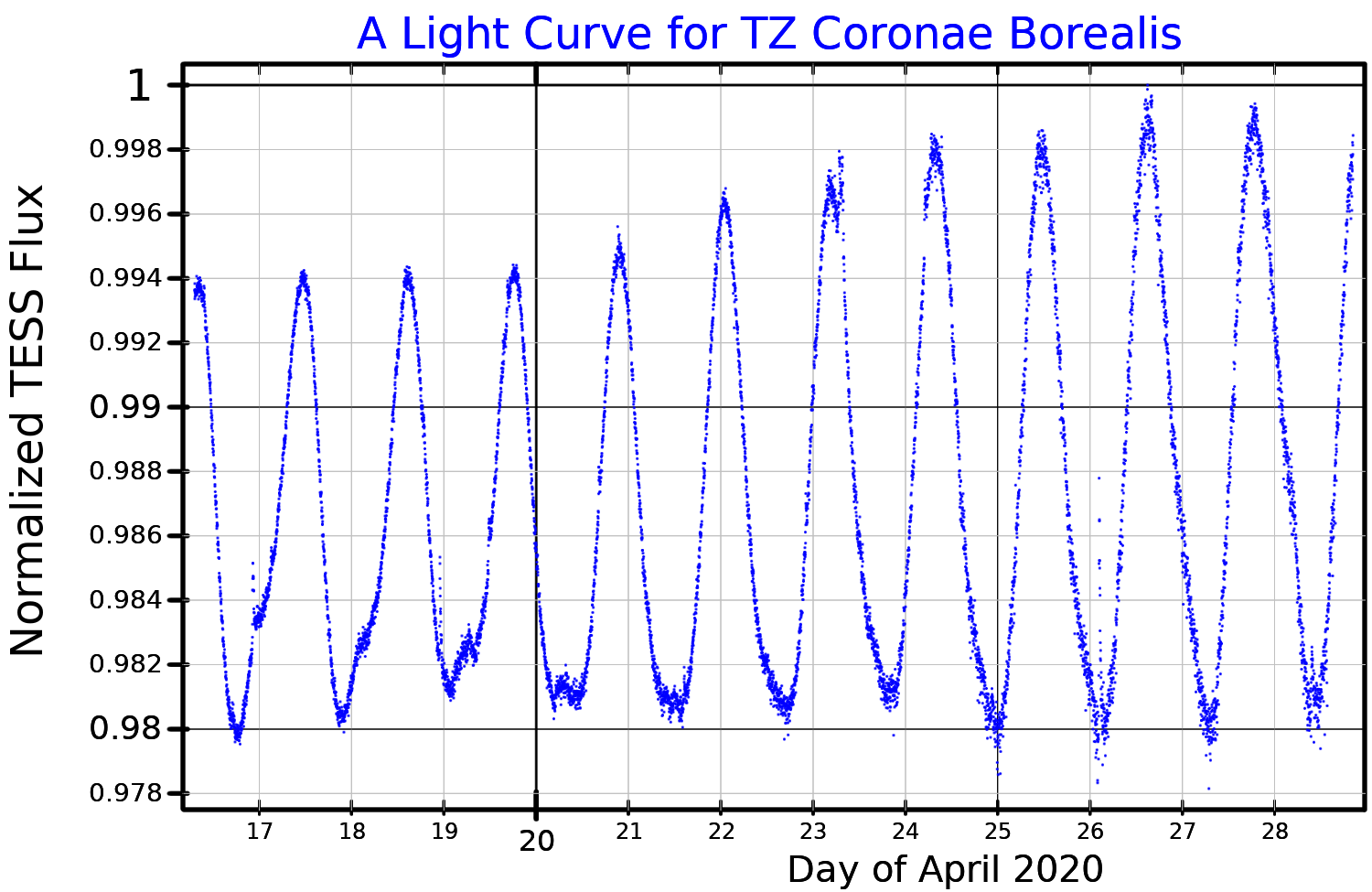
A light curve for TZ Coronae Borealis, plotted from TESS data

The spectroscopic binary σ^{2} CrB is an RS Canum Venaticorum variable. It varies in brightness by 0.05 magnitudes every 1.139789 days, the same as the orbital period. The brightness changes are caused by variations in surface brightness on the stars, effectively giant sunspots. Variable star designations are not given to stars with Bayer designations, but in this case only one component of σ Coronae Borealis is identified as variable, so it has the designation TZ Coronae Borealis.

== See also ==
- Xi Ursae Majoris, another quintuple containing an RS CVn binary
