= Omicron Coronae Borealis =

Star in the constellation Corona Borealis

o Coronae Borealis
- Location of o Coronae Borealis (circled)

Observation data Epoch J2000.0 Equinox ICRS
- Constellation: Corona Borealis
- Right ascension: 15^{h} 20^{m} 08.559^{s}
- Declination: +29° 36′ 58.35″
- Apparent magnitude (V): +5.53

Characteristics
- Evolutionary stage: red clump
- Spectral type: K0 III
- U−B color index: +0.786
- B−V color index: +1.009

Astrometry
Radial velocity (R_{v})	−54.15±0.20 km/s
Proper motion (μ)	RA: −117.972 mas/yr Dec.: −42.922 mas/yr
Parallax (π)	11.9113±0.0572 mas
Distance	274 ± 1 ly (84.0 ± 0.4 pc)
Absolute magnitude (M_{V})	+0.92

Details
Mass	1.07±0.19 M_{☉}
Radius	10.13±0.40 R_{☉}
Luminosity	50.1 L_{☉}
Surface gravity (log g)	2.70±0.06 cgs
Temperature	4,812±13 K
Metallicity [Fe/H]	−0.24±0.01 dex
Rotational velocity (v sin i)	0.47±0.61 km/s
Age	5.54±2.79 Gyr

Other designations
- o CrB, 1 Coronae Borealis, NSV 7032, BD+30°2647, GC 20619, HD 136512, HIP 75049, HR 5709, SAO 83768, WDS J15201+2937A, 2MASS J15200853+2936584

Database references
SIMBAD	data
Exoplanet Archive	data

Omicron Coronae Borealis is a star in the northern constellation of Corona Borealis. Its name is a Bayer designation that is Latinized from o Coronae Borealis, and is abbreviated Omicron CrB or o CrB. This is a faint star but visible to the naked eye on a dark night with an apparent visual magnitude of +5.53. The annual parallax shift of the star as seen from Earth is 11.91 mas, which provides a distance estimate of approximately 274 light-years (84 pc). It is moving closer to the Sun with a radial velocity of −54 km/s.

Based upon the spectrum of this star, it has a stellar classification of K0 III. This indicates this is an evolved K-type giant star that has exhausted the hydrogen at its core and has left the main sequence. It is a red clump star, which means it is now generating energy through helium fusion at its core. This star has 107% of the mass of the Sun and has expanded to over ten times the Sun's radius. It is radiating 50 times the Sun's luminosity from its expanded photosphere at an effective temperature of 4,812 K.

== Planetary system ==
Omicron Coronae Borealis has one confirmed planet, believed to be, along with HD 100655 b, one of the two least massive planets known around red clump giants. The planet was detected by measuring changes in radial velocity of the host star caused by gravitational perturbation of the orbiting object. It is orbiting with a period of 188 days, at a semimajor axis 83% of the mean separation between the Earth and the Sun, and an eccentricity of 0.19.

The Omicron Coronae Borealis planetary system
Companion (in order from star)	Mass	Semimajor axis (AU)	Orbital period (days)	Eccentricity	Inclination (°)	Radius
b	>1.5 M_{J}	0.83	187.83 ± 0.54	0.191 ± 0.085	—	—
