= Eta Coronae Borealis =

Binary star in the constellation Corona Boeralis

η Coronae Borealis
- Location of η Corona Borealis (circled)

Observation data Epoch J2000.0 Equinox ICRS
- Constellation: Corona Borealis
- Right ascension: 15^{h} 23^{m} 12.305^{s}
- Declination: +30° 17′ 16.17″
- Apparent magnitude (V): 4.98

Characteristics
- Spectral type: G1V + G3V + L8
- U−B color index: +0.04
- B−V color index: +0.58

Astrometry
Radial velocity (R_{v})	−7.410±0.054 km/s
Proper motion (μ)	RA: +116.83 mas/yr Dec.: −171.37 mas/yr
Parallax (π)	58.786±0.084 mas
Distance	55.48 ± 0.08 ly (17.01 ± 0.02 pc)

Orbit
Primary	Eta Coronae Borealis A
Name	Eta Coronae Borealis B
Period (P)	15,204.9(1.4) days
Semi-major axis (a)	0.86226(33) mas (15.79±0.27 AU)
Eccentricity (e)	0.27907(26)
Inclination (i)	58.084±0.026°
Longitude of the node (Ω)	202.827±0.024°
Periastron epoch (T)	42,612.9±3.4
Argument of periastron (ω) (secondary)	39.24±0.37°
Argument of periastron (ω) (primary)	219.2±0.37°
Semi-amplitude (K_{1}) (primary)	4.709±0.095 km/s
Semi-amplitude (K_{2}) (secondary)	5.276±0.054 km/s

Position (relative to Eta Coronae Borealis AB)
Component	Eta Coronae Borealis C
Angular distance	195.3″
Position angle	136°
Projected separation	3,635 AU

Details

A
Mass	1.243±0.054 M_{☉}
Radius	0.99 (Note: Calculated, using the Stefan-Boltzmann law and the star's effective temperature and luminosity, with respect to the solar nominal effective temperature of 5,772 K: $$\sqrt{\left(\frac{5,772}{6,060}\right)^4 \cdot 10^{0.08}} = 0.99\ R_\odot.$$) R_{☉}
Luminosity	1.2 L_{☉}
Surface gravity (log g)	4.45 cgs
Temperature	6,060±53 K
Metallicity [Fe/H]	−0.03 dex
Rotational velocity (v sin i)	6.6 km/s
Age	2.62+0.50 −0.93 Gyr

B
Mass	1.100±0.039 M_{☉}
Radius	0.89 (Note: Calculated, using the Stefan-Boltzmann law and the star's effective temperature and luminosity, with respect to the solar nominal effective temperature of 5,772 K: $$\sqrt{\left(\frac{5,772}{5,948}\right)^4 \cdot 10^{-0.05}} = 0.89\ R_\odot.$$) R_{☉}
Luminosity	0.89 L_{☉}
Surface gravity (log g)	4.51 cgs
Temperature	5,948±36 K
Metallicity [Fe/H]	-0.04 dex
Rotational velocity (v sin i)	7.0 km/s
Age	3.11+1.30 −1.13 Gyr

C
Mass	44±6 M_{Jup}
Radius	0.95±0.03 R_{Jup}
Luminosity	1.91+0.28 −0.25×10^{−5} L_{☉}
Surface gravity (log g)	5.11±0.09 cgs
Temperature	1,237±24 K
Age	3 to 5 Gyr

Other designations
- 2 Coronae Borealis, BD+30 2653, GJ 584, HIP 75312, HR 5727
- A: HD 137107
- B: HD 137108

Database references
SIMBAD	data
- A
- B

Eta Coronae Borealis is a stellar system in the northern constellation of Corona Borealis. Its name is a Bayer designation that is Latinized from η Coronae Borealis, and abbreviated Eta CrB or η CrB. The system has a combined apparent visual magnitude of 4.98, which means it is faintly visible to the naked eye as a point of light. Based on parallax measurements, it lies at a distance of approximately 55 light-years. The primary component is a mid-wide binary, while a brown dwarf component is located at a wide separation.

== Components ==
Eta Coronae Borealis has been known since the late 18th century to be a moderate-separation binary. The orbit of the two components takes approximately 42 years, which when combined with the distance to the system makes the two stars fairly easily resolvable with a larger telescope. Possible stable planetary orbits in the habitable zone were calculated for the system in 1996.

This system consists of two G-dwarfs that have similar properties to the Sun. At present the angular separation between both stars is 0.5 arcseconds, so a telescope with a diameter of over 25 centimetres is required to resolve it.

The estimated age of the system is around three billion years. Component A has 1.2 times the mass of the Sun and is radiating 1.2 times the Sun's luminosity from its photosphere at an effective temperature of 6,060 K. Component B has 1.1 times the Sun's mass and radiates nearly double the Sun's luminosity at an effective temperature of 5,948 K.

A brown dwarf companion was detected in 2001. The source 2MASSW J1523226+301456 in the 2MASS working database was identified as having a similar proper motion to the AB binary, and subsequent observations confirmed its relationship to the system. The new component, Eta Coronae Borealis C, was found to have a spectral type of L8. The brown dwarf has a minimum separation of 3600 AU, and considering a cooling age of 1–2.5 gigayears, the brown dwarf has a mass of 0.060 ± 0.015 M_{☉}, or 63 ± 16 M_{J}.

== See also ==
- 81 Cancri
