= Mu Coronae Borealis =

Star in the constellation Corona Borealis

μ Coronae Borealis
- Location of μ Coronae Borealis (circled)

Observation data Epoch J2000.0 Equinox J2000.0 (ICRS)
- Constellation: Corona Borealis
- Right ascension: 15^{h} 35^{m} 14.91862^{s}
- Declination: +39° 00′ 36.2427″
- Apparent magnitude (V): 5.12

Characteristics
- Evolutionary stage: asymptotic giant branch
- Spectral type: M1.5 IIIb
- U−B color index: +2.01
- B−V color index: +1.64
- Variable type: Unknown type

Astrometry
Radial velocity (R_{v})	−13.17±0.35 km/s
Proper motion (μ)	RA: +24.780 mas/yr Dec.: +8.594 mas/yr
Parallax (π)	5.9176±0.0830 mas
Distance	551 ± 8 ly (169 ± 2 pc)
Absolute magnitude (M_{V})	−1.25

Details
Mass	3.0 M_{☉}
Radius	78 R_{☉}
Luminosity	2,512 L_{☉}
Surface gravity (log g)	1.5 cgs
Temperature	3,600 K
Metallicity [Fe/H]	0.00 dex

Other designations
- μ CrB, 6 CrB, BD+34°2773, HD 139153, HIP 76307, HR 5800

Database references
SIMBAD	data

Mu Coronae Borealis is a solitary, ruby-hued star located in the northern constellation of Corona Borealis. Its name is a Bayer designation that is Latinized from μ Coronae Borealis, and abbreviated Mu CrB or μ CrB. This star is faintly visible to the naked eye, having an apparent visual magnitude of around 5.12. Based upon an annual parallax shift of 5.92 mas, it is located at a distance of approximately 551 light-years (169 pc) from the Sun. It is rifting closer with a line of sight velocity component of −13 km/s.

This is an evolved red giant star with a stellar classification of M1.5 IIIb. It is currently on the asymptotic giant branch and is a variable star of uncertain type, showing a change in brightness with an amplitude of 0.0147 magnitude and a frequency of 0.02455 cycles per day, or 40.7 days/cycle. This star has 3.0 times the mass of the Sun and has expanded to 78 times the Sun's radius. On average, it is radiating 2,512 times the Sun's luminosity from its enlarged photosphere at an effective temperature of 3,600 K.
