= Upsilon Coronae Borealis =

Star in the constellation Corona Borealis

υ Coronae Borealis
- Location of υ Coronae Borealis (circled)

Observation data Epoch J2000.0 Equinox J2000.0 (ICRS)
- Constellation: Corona Borealis
- Right ascension: 16^{h} 16^{m} 44.78710^{s}
- Declination: +29° 09′ 00.9382″
- Apparent magnitude (V): 5.78

Characteristics
- Evolutionary stage: subgiant
- Spectral type: A3V or A3IV
- U−B color index: +0.10
- B−V color index: +0.07

Astrometry
Radial velocity (R_{v})	0.8±1.0 km/s
Proper motion (μ)	RA: +23.672 mas/yr Dec.: −16.546 mas/yr
Parallax (π)	5.2987±0.0347 mas
Distance	616 ± 4 ly (189 ± 1 pc)
Absolute magnitude (M_{V})	−0.72

Details
Mass	3.06±0.19 M_{☉}
Radius	5.6 R_{☉}
Luminosity	151 L_{☉}
Surface gravity (log g)	3.8 cgs
Temperature	8,098 K
Metallicity [Fe/H]	−0.65 dex
Rotational velocity (v sin i)	112 km/s
Age	407 Myr

Other designations
- υ CrB, 18 Coronae Borealis, NSV 7596, BD+29°2803, FK5 3287, HD 146738, HIP 79757, HR 6074, SAO 84281, WDS J16167+2909

Database references
SIMBAD	data

Upsilon Coronae Borealis is a solitary star in the northern constellation of Corona Borealis. Its name is a Bayer designation that is Latinized from υ Coronae Borealis, and abbreviated Upsilon CrB or υ CrB. This is a white-hued star that is dimly visible to the naked eye with an apparent visual magnitude of 5.78. The distance to this object is approximately 616 light-years (189 pc) based on parallax.

This is an A-type main-sequence star with a stellar classification of A3V; a star that is currently fusing its core hydrogen. However, Palmer et al. (1968) had it classed as type A2IV, and thus it may be near or past its main sequence lifetime. It is a suspected variable star of unknown type that has been measured ranging in brightness from magnitude 5.78 down to 5.88.

Upsilon Coronae Borealis has three times the mass of the Sun and about six times the Sun's radius. It is spinning with a projected rotational velocity of 112 km/s. The star is radiating 151 times the luminosity of the Sun from its photosphere at an effective temperature of 8,098 K. At an age of 407 million years, it is thought to be right at the end of its main sequence life.
