= Lambda Coronae Borealis =

Yellow-white hued star in the constellation Corona Borealis

λ Coronae Borealis
- Location of λ Coronae Borealis (circled)

Observation data Epoch J2000 Equinox ICRS
- Constellation: Corona Borealis
- Right ascension: 15^{h} 55^{m} 47.58728^{s}
- Declination: +37° 56′ 49.0449″
- Apparent magnitude (V): 5.43

Characteristics
- Evolutionary stage: main sequence
- Spectral type: F2 IV-V
- U−B color index: +0.01
- B−V color index: +0.352±0.004

Astrometry
Radial velocity (R_{v})	−11.6±0.8 km/s
Proper motion (μ)	RA: +29.460 mas/yr Dec.: +79.199 mas/yr
Parallax (π)	23.7741±0.0530 mas
Distance	137.2 ± 0.3 ly (42.06 ± 0.09 pc)
Absolute magnitude (M_{V})	+2.34

Details
Mass	1.60±0.02 M_{☉}
Radius	2.23±0.04 R_{☉}
Luminosity	9.53±0.04 L_{☉}
Surface gravity (log g)	4.05±0.02 cgs
Temperature	6,991±63 K
Metallicity [Fe/H]	0.00±0.05 dex
Rotational velocity (v sin i)	75.7±3.8 km/s
Age	1.42+0.08 −0.20 Gyr

Other designations
- λ CrB, 12 Coronae Borealis, FK5 3259, GJ 9531, HD 142908, HIP 78012, HR 5936, WDS J15558+3757A

Database references
SIMBAD	data

Lambda Coronae Borealis is a single star in the northern constellation of Corona Borealis. Its name is a Bayer designation that is Latinised from λ Coronae Borealis, and abbreviated λ CrB or λ CrB. In publications it can be identified as HR 5936 or HD 142908. This star has a yellow-white hue and is dimly visible to the naked eye with an apparent visual magnitude of 5.43. It is located at a distance of 137 light years based on parallax, but is drifting closer with a radial velocity of −12 km/s.

The stellar classification of Lambda Coronae Borealis is F2 IV-V, which means it is somewhat hotter than the sun and shows spectral features intermediate between a main sequence and subgiant star. It has an estimated age of 1.4 billion years with a relatively high projected rotational velocity of 76 km/s. The star has 1.6 times the mass of the Sun and 2.2 times the Sun's radius. Based on the amount of iron in the atmosphere, the elemental abundances are similar to those in the Sun. It is radiating 9.5 times the luminosity of the Sun from its photosphere at an effective temperature of 6,991 K.

The star displays an infrared excess with a signature that indicates a pair of circumstellar disks of dusty debris are orbiting the star. A blackbody fit to the higher temperature signal gives a temperature of 320 K with an orbital distance of 2.20 AU. The cooler outer disk is orbiting 144.07 AU from the star with a temperature of 40 K.

A magnitude 11.44 visual companion was discovered by W. Herschel in 1782. As of 2015, it was located at an angular separation of 90.6″ from the brighter component, along a position angle of 68°.
