= Tau Coronae Borealis =

Star in the constellation Corona Borealis

τ Coronae Borealis
- Location of τ Coronae Borealis (circled)

Observation data Epoch J2000.0 Equinox J2000.0 (ICRS)
- Constellation: Corona Borealis
- Right ascension: 16^{h} 08^{m} 58.309^{s}
- Declination: +36° 29′ 27.134″
- Apparent magnitude (V): 4.76 (4.89 + 13.2)

Characteristics
- Evolutionary stage: red clump
- Spectral type: K1 III-IV
- U−B color index: +0.86
- B−V color index: +1.01

Astrometry
Radial velocity (R_{v})	−21.02±0.33 km/s
Proper motion (μ)	RA: −59.431 mas/yr Dec.: +332.280 mas/yr
Parallax (π)	29.0217±0.1275 mas
Distance	112.4 ± 0.5 ly (34.5 ± 0.2 pc)
Absolute magnitude (M_{V})	+2.03

Details
Mass	1.45 M_{☉}
Radius	6 R_{☉}
Luminosity	16.2 L_{☉}
Surface gravity (log g)	3.1 cgs
Temperature	4,742 K
Metallicity [Fe/H]	−0.20 dex
Rotational velocity (v sin i)	1.7 km/s
Age	3.4 Gyr

Other designations
- τ CrB, 16 CrB, BD+36°2699, HD 145328, HIP 79119, HR 6018, SAO 65108

Database references
SIMBAD	data

Tau Coronae Borealis is a possible astrometric and spectroscopic binary star system in the northern constellation of Corona Borealis. Its name is a Bayer designation that is Latinized from τ Coronae Borealis, and abbreviated τ CrB or τ CrB. This system is visible to the naked eye with an apparent visual magnitude of 4.76. Based upon an annual parallax shift of 29.02 mas as seen from Earth, it is located about 112.4 light-years (34.5 pc) from the Sun. At that distance, the visual magnitude of the system is diminished by an extinction factor of 0.04 due to interstellar dust.

Tau CrB has a visible companion of visual magnitude 13.2 and they have been treated as a common proper motion pair. As of 2014, the pair had an angular separation of 2.20 arc seconds along a position angle of 186°. It has also been described as a spectroscopic binary, but this has not been confirmed. Due to an abnormal space motion, it has also been described as an astrometric binary although there is no apparent orbit.

The primary component is a magnitude 4.89 K-type star with a stellar classification of K1 III-IV, having a spectrum that shows mixed traits of an evolved subgiant and giant star. It is catalogued as a red clump giant, which would indicate it is generating energy through helium fusion at its core. The star has expanded to six times the Sun's radius and is radiating 16 times the solar luminosity from its photosphere at an effective temperature of 4,742 K.
