= Pi Coronae Borealis =

Star in the constellation Corona Borealis

π Coronae Borealis
- Location of π Coronae Borealis (circled)

Observation data Epoch J2000.0 Equinox J2000.0 (ICRS)
- Constellation: Corona Borealis
- Right ascension: 15^{h} 43^{m} 59.299^{s}
- Declination: +32° 30′ 56.901″
- Apparent magnitude (V): 5.578

Characteristics
- Evolutionary stage: red clump
- Spectral type: G9 III: or K0 III
- B−V color index: 1.074

Astrometry
Radial velocity (R_{v})	−4.94±0.51 km/s
Proper motion (μ)	RA: −30.287 mas/yr Dec.: −9.363 mas/yr
Parallax (π)	12.5965±0.0411 mas
Distance	258.9 ± 0.8 ly (79.4 ± 0.3 pc)
Absolute magnitude (M_{V})	+1.21

Details
Mass	1.61 M_{☉}
Radius	10 R_{☉}
Luminosity	39 L_{☉}
Surface gravity (log g)	2.7 cgs
Temperature	4,667±5 K
Metallicity [Fe/H]	−0.15 dex
Rotational velocity (v sin i)	3.5 km/s
Age	4.6 Gyr

Other designations
- Stephanos, π CrB, 9 CrB, BD+32°2621, FK5 3249, GC 21161, HD 140716, HIP 77048, HR 5855, SAO 64870

Database references
SIMBAD	data

Pi Coronae Borealis is a solitary, orange-hued star in the northern constellation of Corona Borealis. It has the proper name Stephanos; Pi Coronae Borealis is its Bayer designation, which is Latinized from π Coronae Borealis and abbreviated Pi CrB or π CrB. The star has an apparent visual magnitude of 5.58, which is bright enough to be faintly visible to the naked eye. Based upon an annual parallax shift of 12.60 mas as measured from Earth, it is located at a distance of about 258.9 light-years (79.4 pc) from the Sun. The star is moving closer to the Sun with a radial velocity of −5 km/s. It is most likely (98% chance) a member of the thin disk population.

This is an evolved G-type giant star with a stellar classification of G9 III:, where the ':' indicates some uncertainty about the classification. (Bartkevicius and Lazauskaite (1997) classify it as K0 III.) The star has 1.61 times the mass of the Sun and has expanded to about 10 times the Sun's radius. The abundance of iron is lower than in the Sun: the star is considered metal deficient. It is a red clump giant, fusing helium in its core. It is around 4.6 billion years old and is radiating 39 times the Sun's luminosity from its enlarged photosphere at an effective temperature of 4,667 K.

Stephanos (Στέφανος), the wreath, is the ancient Greek name of Corona Borealis. The IAU Working Group on Star Names adopted the name Stephanos for this star on 14 May 2026.
