= Epsilon Coronae Borealis =

Binary star system in the constellation Corona Borealis

- Location of ε Coronae Borealis (circled)

Observation data Epoch J2000 Equinox ICRS
- Constellation: Corona Borealis
- Right ascension: 15^{h} 57^{m} 35.25147^{s}
- Declination: +26° 52′ 40.3635″
- Apparent magnitude (V): 4.13

Characteristics
- Spectral type: K2 III
- U−B color index: +1.28
- B−V color index: +1.231±0.001

Astrometry
Radial velocity (R_{v})	−32.42±0.07 km/s
Proper motion (μ)	RA: −77.716 mas/yr Dec.: −60.971 mas/yr
Parallax (π)	13.4922±0.1023 mas
Distance	242 ± 2 ly (74.1 ± 0.6 pc)
Absolute magnitude (M_{V})	−0.02

Details

ε CrB A
Mass	1.69+0.29 −0.30 M_{☉}
Radius	23.87±1.04 R_{☉}
Luminosity	194±5 L_{☉}
Surface gravity (log g)	1.94±0.15 cgs
Temperature	4,408±96 K
Metallicity [Fe/H]	−0.22±0.03 dex
Rotational velocity (v sin i)	2.4 km/s
Age	1,600+1,420 −447 Gyr

Other designations
- ε CrB, 13 Coronae Borealis, BD+27°2558, FK5 593, GC 21440, HD 143107, HIP 78159, HR 5947, SAO 84098, WDS J15576+2653A, 2MASS J15573523+2652400

Database references
SIMBAD	data

Epsilon Coronae Borealis is a binary star system in the northern constellation of Corona Borealis. Its name is a Bayer designation that is Latinized from ε Coronae Borealis, and abbreviated Epsilon CrB or ε CrB. This system shines with a combined apparent magnitude of 4.13, meaning it is visible to the unaided eye in all night skies except those brightly lit in inner city locations. Based on parallax measurements, it is located at a distance of around 242 light-years (74 pc) light-years from the Sun. The system is drifting closer with a line of sight velocity component of −32 km/s.

The primary component has a spectrum matching the stellar classification K2III, which suggests it is a giant star that exhausted its hydrogen supply at its core and evolved off the main sequence. Being 70% more massive than the Sun and 1.6 billion years old, it expanded to nearly 24 times the Sun's size and cooled to an effective temperature of 4,408 K. That is, Epsilon Coronae Borealis's diameter is about one-quarter of Mercury's orbit. The star radiates with 194 times the Sun's luminosity.

Epsilon Coronae Borealis B is a companion star thought to be an orange dwarf of spectral type in the range K3V to K9V that orbits at a distance of 135 astronomical units, completing one orbit every 900 years.

A faint (magnitude 11.5) star, at an angular separation of 1.5′, is designated Epsilon Coronae Borealis C, although it is only close by line of sight and is unrelated to the system.

Epsilon Coronae Borealis lies one degree north of (and is used as a guide for) the variable T Coronae Borealis.

== Planetary system ==
The ε CrB star system's radial velocity was observed over seven years from January 2005 to January 2012, during which time a 'wobble' with a period of around 418 days was recorded. This is inferred to be due to an orbiting exoplanetary companion, calculated as at least 6.7 times as massive as Jupiter orbiting at a distance of 1.3 astronomical units with an eccentricity of 0.11.

The Epsilon Coronae Borealis planetary system
Companion (in order from star)	Mass	Semimajor axis (AU)	Orbital period (days)	Eccentricity	Inclination (°)	Radius
b	≥6.7 ± 0.3 M_{J}	1.3	417.9 ± 0.5	0.11 ± 0.03	—	—
