= Rho Coronae Borealis =

Star in the constellation Corona Borealis

ρ Coronae Borealis
- Location of ρ Coronae Borealis (circled)

Observation data Epoch J2000.0 Equinox ICRS
- Constellation: Corona Borealis
- Right ascension: 16^{h} 01^{m} 02.66049^{s}
- Declination: +33° 18′ 12.6395″
- Apparent magnitude (V): 5.39

Characteristics
- Evolutionary stage: subgiant
- Spectral type: G0V
- B−V color index: 0.61

Astrometry
Radial velocity (R_{v})	−8.655±0.109 km/s
Proper motion (μ)	RA: −198.278(43) mas/yr Dec.: −772.245(53) mas/yr
Parallax (π)	57.1076±0.0508 mas
Distance	57.11 ± 0.05 ly (17.51 ± 0.02 pc)
Absolute magnitude (M_{V})	+4.21

Details
Mass	0.95±0.01 M_{☉}
Radius	1.304±0.012 R_{☉}
Luminosity	1.749±0.040 L_{☉}
Surface gravity (log g)	4.25±0.05 cgs
Temperature	5,817±24 K
Metallicity [Fe/H]	−0.24±0.08 dex
Rotation	20.3±1.8 d
Rotational velocity (v sin i)	0.8±0.3 km/s
Age	10.2±0.5 Gyr

Other designations
- ρ CrB, 15 CrB, BD+33°2663, GC 21527, GJ 606.2, GJ 9537, HD 143761, HIP 78459, HR 5968, SAO 65024, CCDM J16011+3318A, WDS J16010+3318A, LHS 3145, LTT 14764, 2MASS J16010264+3318124

Database references
SIMBAD	data
Exoplanet Archive	data
ARICNS	data

Rho Coronae Borealis is a yellow-hued star in the northern constellation of Corona Borealis. Its name is a Bayer designation that is Latinized from ρ Coronae Borealis and abbreviated Rho CrB or ρ CrB. It is faintly visible to the naked eye with an apparent visual magnitude of 5.39. Based on parallax measurements, it is located at a distance of 57.1 light-years (17.5 parsecs). The star is thought to be a slightly more evolved star that is otherwise similar to the Sun with nearly the same mass, radius, and luminosity. It is orbited by three known exoplanets.

== Stellar properties ==
Rho Coronae Borealis is a yellow subgiant star of the spectral type G0V. The star is estimated to have 96 percent of the Sun's mass, along with 1.3 times its radius, and 1.7 times its luminosity. It may only be 51 to 65 percent as enriched with elements heavier than hydrogen (based on its abundance of iron) and is likely somewhat older than the Sun at around ten billion years old.

The Rho Coronae Borealis has a relatively fast rotation with a period approximately 20 days, even though at this age stars are hypothesized to decouple their rotational evolution and magnetic activity.

Multiple star catalogs list a 10th-magnitude companion about two arc-minutes away, but it is an unrelated background object.

== Planetary system ==
An extrasolar planet in a 39.8-day orbit around Rho Coronae Borealis was discovered in 1997 by observing the star's radial velocity variations. This detection method only gives a lower limit on the true mass of the companion. In 2001, preliminary Hipparcos astrometric satellite data indicated that the orbital inclination of the star's companion was 0.5°, nearly face-on, implying that its mass was as much as 115 times Jupiter's. A paper published in 2011 supported this claim using a new reduction of the astrometric data, with an updated mass value of 169.7 times Jupiter, with a 3σ confidence region 100.1 to 199.6 Jupiter masses. Such a massive body would be a dim red dwarf star, not a planet. However, interferometric observations published in 2016 found no evidence for a red dwarf at the expected separation. A 2022 astrometric study analysing Hipparcos and Gaia proper motion measurements also found no evidence for a companion at a high signal-to-noise ratio.

A second planetary companion was detected in a 102-day orbit. The discovery of another two planets was reported in 2023. However, a 2026 follow-up study by the same authors found that the apparent outermost planet d (with a 281-day period) was a spurious detection caused by instrumental errors from the EXPRES spectrograph. The system currently has three known planets: e, b & c.

The evolution of the parent star, nearing the conclusion of its life cycle, has been regarded as a model for the potential evolution of our planetary system. This is especially relevant for predicting whether the Sun will eventually engulf the Earth at the end of its own lifecycle (cf. Future of Earth).

The Rho Coronae Borealis planetary system
Companion (in order from star)	Mass	Semimajor axis (AU)	Orbital period (days)	Eccentricity	Inclination (°)	Radius
e	≥3.71±0.60 M_{🜨}	0.1061±0.0011	12.904±0.011	0.082±0.047	—	—
b	≥1.0950±0.0002 M_{J}	0.2245+0.0023 −0.0024	39.849±0.002	0.046±0.002	—	—
c	≥27.4±0.7 M_{🜨}	0.4206+0.0044 −0.0045	102.0±0.2	0.048±0.034	—	—

== Circumstellar material ==
In October 1999, astronomers at the University of Arizona announced the existence of a circumstellar disk around the star. Follow-up observations with the Spitzer Space Telescope failed to detect any infrared excess at 24- or 70-micrometre wavelengths, which would be expected if a disk were present. No evidence for a disk was detected in observations with the Herschel Space Observatory either.

== See also ==
- List of exoplanets discovered before 2000 - Rho Coronae Borealis b
- List of exoplanets discovered in 2016 - Rho Coronae Borealis c
- List of exoplanets discovered in 2023 - Rho Coronae Borealis d and Rho Coronae Borealis e
