= List of largest optical refracting telescopes =

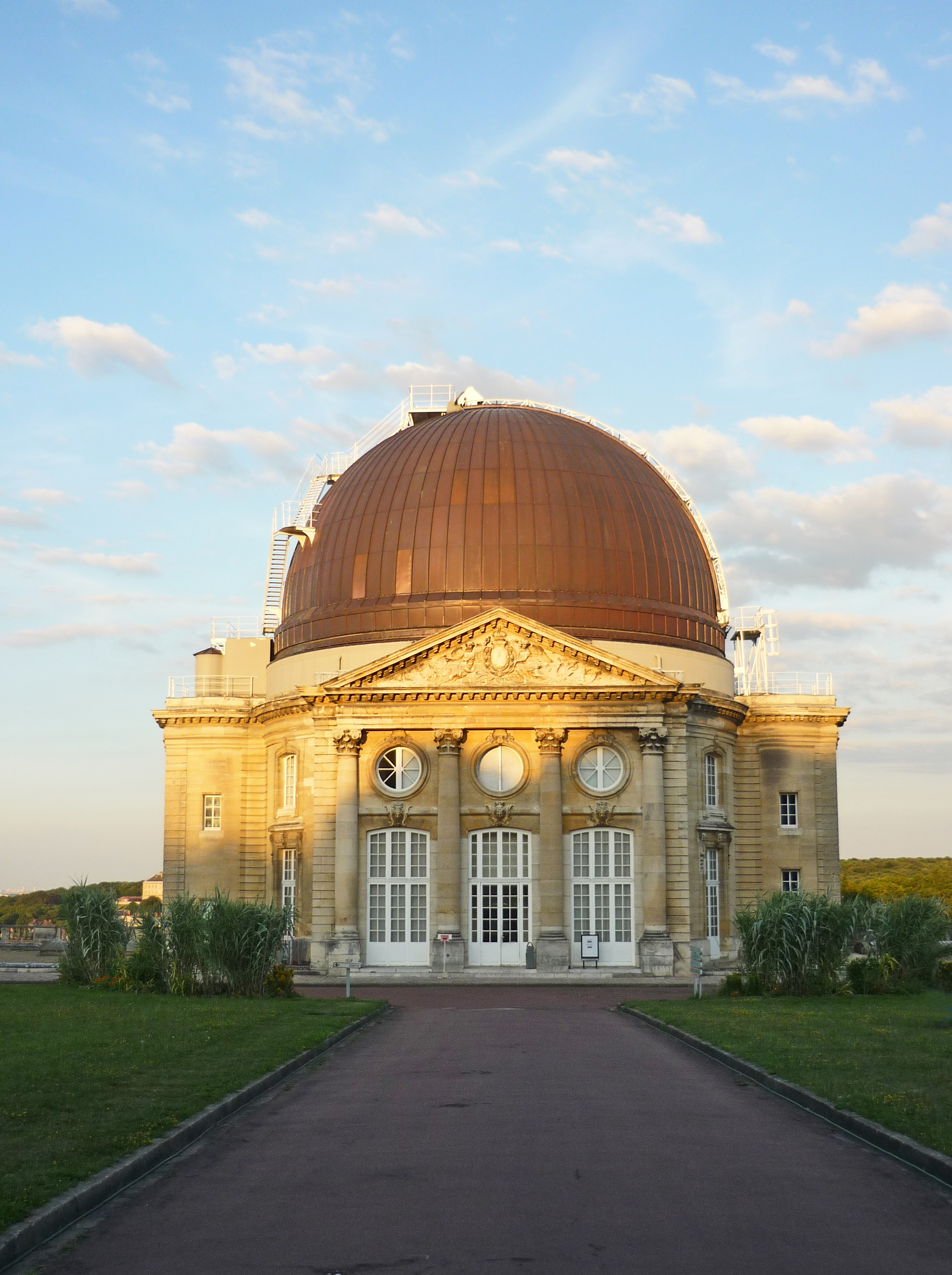
The Grande Coupole for the double refractor of Meudon, with roughly 83 cm (33 in) and 62 cm (24 in) aperture lenses on the same mounting, and making its debut in 1891.

Refracting telescopes use a lens to focus light. The Swedish 1-m Solar Telescope, with a lens diameter of 43 inches, is technically the largest, with 39 inches clear for the aperture. The second largest refracting telescope in the world is the Yerkes Observatory 40 inch (102 cm) refractor, used for astronomical and scientific observation for over a century. The next largest refractor telescopes are the James Lick telescope, and the Meudon Great Refractor.

Most are classical great refractors, which used achromatic doublets on an equatorial mount. However, other large refractors include a 21st-century solar telescope which is not directly comparable because it uses a single element non-achromatic lens, and the short-lived Great Paris Exhibition Telescope of 1900. It used a 78-inch (200 cm) Focault siderostat for aiming light into the Image-forming optical system part of the telescope, which had a 125 cm diameter lens. Using a siderostat incurs a reflective loss. Larger meniscus lenses have been used in later catadioptric telescopes which mix refractors and reflectors in the image-forming part of the telescope. As with reflecting telescopes, there was an ongoing struggle to balance cost with size, quality, and usefulness.

== List ==
This list includes some additional examples, such as the Great Paris telescope, which also used a mirror, and some solar telescopes which may have more complicated optical configurations. The SST has an optical aperture of 98 cm (39.37"), although the lens itself is 110 cm (43.31"). It is a single element lens whereas most of this list are doublets, with a crown and flint lens elements.

Name/Observatory	Location at debut	Modern location name or fate	Lens diameter	Focal length	Built	Comments	Image
Great Paris Exhibition Telescope of 1900	Paris 1900 Exposition	Dismantled 1900	125 cm (49.21")	57 m (187 ft)	1900	Fixed lens, scrapped. Aimed via a 2 m reflecting siderostat	
Swedish Solar Telescope, ORM	La Palma, Spain	-	110 cm (43") total diameter 98 cm (39") clear aperture	15 m	2002	Single element non-achromatic objective combined with reflective Adaptive optics and a Schupmann corrector. The lens is 110 cm in diameter stopped down to 98 cm (39").	
Yerkes Observatory	Williams Bay, Wisconsin, USA	-	102 cm (40")	19.4 m (62 ft)	1897	Largest in current operation.	
James Lick telescope Lick Observatory	Mount Hamilton, California, USA	-	91 cm (36")	17.6 m	1888		
Grande Lunette; Paris Observatory	Meudon, France	-	83 cm + 62 cm (32.67"+24.41")	16.2 m	1891	Double telescope	
Großer Refraktor; Astrophysical Observatory Potsdam	Potsdam, Deutsches Kaiserreich	Potsdam, Germany	80 cm + 50 cm (31.5"+19.5")	12.0 m	1899	Double telescope by Repsold and Sons, optics by Steinheil	
Grande Lunette; Nice Observatory	Nice, France	since 1988 Côte d'Azur Observatory	77 cm (30.3")	17.9 m	1886	Bischoffscheim funded	
William Thaw Telescope; Allegheny Observatory, University of Pittsburgh	Pittsburgh, Pennsylvania, USA	-	76 cm (30")	14.1 m	1914	Brashear made, photographic	
Pulkovo observatory	Saint Petersburg, Russian Empire	Destroyed	76 cm (30")	12.8 m (42 feet)	1885	Destroyed during WWII, only lens (made by Alvan Clark & Sons) survives.	
28-inch Grubb Refractor; Royal Greenwich Observatory	Greenwich, London, Great Britain	-	71 cm (28")	8.5 m	1894		
Rolfscher Refraktor	Rathenow, Germany	-	70 cm (27.6")	20.8 m	1949	Single element non-achromatic objective with Schupmann corrector.	
Großer Refraktor; Vienna Observatory	Vienna, Austrian Empire	Vienna, Austria	69 cm (27" )	10.5 m	1880	Largest refractor in 1880, by Grubb	
Great Treptow Refractor; Treptow Observatory	Berlin, Germany	-	68 cm (26.77")	21 m	1896	renamed Archenhold Observatory 1946	
Innes Telescope	Observatory Johannesburg, South Africa	Observatory Johannesburg, South Africa	67 cm (26.5")	11.6 m	1909-1925	Still in operation for educational purposes. By Grubb	
Yale-Columbia Refractor; Yale Southern Station	Johannesburg, Union of South Africa	Relocated 1952	66 cm (26")	10.8 m	1925–1952	Yale-Columbia Refractor moved to Mount Stromlo Observatory in 1952, same telescope as following entry.	
Yale-Columbia Refractor; Mount Stromlo Observatory	Mount Stromlo, Australia	Destroyed 2003	66 cm (26")	10.8 m	1952	Yale-Columbia Refractor – previously located in South Africa. Relocated to Australia in 1952. Destroyed by bush fire on January 18, 2003.	
Leander McCormick Observatory	Charlottesville, Virginia, USA	-	66 cm (26")	9.9 m	1884	completed c. 1874, installed 1884	
U.S. Naval Observatory	Foggy Bottom Washington, DC, USA	moved to Northwest, Washington, D.C., 1893	66 cm (26")	9.9 m	1873	Largest refractor in 1873. Alvan Clark & Sons mounting replaced with Warner & Swasey mounting in 1893.	
Thompson 26-inch Refractor	Royal Observatory, Greenwich, Great Britain	Equatorial Group, Herstmonceux, Sussex	66 cm (26")	6.82 m	1896	Manufactured by Sir Howard Grubb as a gift from Sir Henry Thompson; originally used at Greenwich on the same mount as a 30 inch reflector	
Llano del Hato National Astronomical Observatory	Llano del Hato, Venezuela	-	65 cm (25.6")	10.6 m	1955		
Belgrade Observatory	Belgrade, Kingdom of Serbia	Belgrade, Serbia	65 cm (25.6")	10.55 m	1932	Zeiss made lens, same as at Berlin Observatory	
Hida Observatory	Gifu, Japan	-	65 cm (25.6")	10.5 m	1972		
65 cm Zeiss Refractor, Pulkovo observatory	Germany	Saint Petersburg, Russia	65 cm (25.6")	10.413 m	1954	War reparation from Germany In Pulkovo since 1954.	
Observatory History Museum Mitaka 65 cm	Mitaka, Tokyo, Japan	-	65 cm (25.6")	10.21 m	1929	Carl Zeiss Jena	
Berlin-Babelsberg Observatory; Berliner Sternwarte Babelsberg	Berlin, Germany		65 cm (26")	10.12 m (33 ft)	1914	Berlin Observatory just moved to Potsdam-Babelsberg in 1913; Zeiss lens	
Newall Refractor; National Observatory of Athens	UK	Athens, Greece since 1957	62.5 cm (24.5")	8.86 m (29 ft)	1869	Built by Thomas Cooke for Robert Stirling Newall. First located at his estate; donated and relocated to Cambridge Observatory in 1889; donated to Athens Observatory and relocated to Mt. Penteli in Greece in 1957. Currently used only for educational purposes as part of the visitor center.	
Craig telescope	Wandsworth Common, London	Dismantled 1857	61 cm (24")	24.5 m (80 ft)	1852	Problem with lens figuring	
Sproul Observatory	Pennsylvania, USA	Dismantled July 2017	61 cm (24")	11.0 m (36 ft)	1911	Currently under restoration to be re-installed in Northwest Arkansas	
Lowell Observatory	Arizona, USA	-	61 cm (24")	9.75 m (32 ft)	1894	Alvan Clark & Sons telescope	
Einstein Tower	Potsdam, Germany	-	60 cm (23.6")	14 m	1924	Tower telescope, fixed lens fed by a heliostat	
Zeiss Double Refractor; Bosscha Observatory	Bandung, Dutch East Indies	Bandung, Indonesia	60 cm (23.6")	10.7 m	1928		
Großer Refraktor (Great Refractor)Hamburg Observatory	Bergedorf, Germany	-	60 cm (23.6")	9 m	1911	by Repsold and Sons, optics (visual + photographic lens) by Steinheil	
Grubb Parsons Double Refractor	Saltsjöbaden, Sweden	-	60 + 50 cm (23.6" + 19.7")	8.0 m	1930	Stockholm Observatory in Saltsjöbaden	
Radcliffe Double Refractor; UCL Observatory	Oxford, UK	Mill Hill, London	60 + 45 cm (23.6" + 18")	7.0 m	1901	Obtained from the Radcliffe Observatory and installed at UCLO (then known as "ULO") in 1938	
Halstead Observatory	Princeton, USA	Roper Mountain Science Center, Greenville, SC	58.4 cm (23")	9.8 m (32 ft)	1881	by Alvan Clark & Sons	
L.U.C.A. Large Ultra Corrected Apochromat	Avezzano, Italy	Inauguration at Associazione scientifica della Marsica on November 6, 2026.	51 cm (20.08'')	6.5 m (21.3)	2025	It is the largest apochromatic telescope in the world and largest refracting telescope in Italy.	
Chamberlin Observatory	Colorado, USA	-	50 cm (20")	8.5 m (28 ft)	1891	First Light 1894	
Chabot Observatory	Oakland, California	Oakland, California, USA (2000)	50 cm (20")	8.5 m (28 ft)	1914	"Rachel", Warner & Swazey Company (Optics John A Brashear Company) Refurbished in 2000 and moved to present location.	
Van Vleck Observatory	Connecticut, USA	-	50 cm (20")	8.4 m (27.5 ft)	1922		
Carnegie Double Astrograph; Lick Observatory	Mount Hamilton, California, USA	Retired?	50 cm (20") x 2	4.67 m (14 ft)	1941/1962 (2nd lens)	F7.4	
Merz-Repsold 19 inch telescope Brera Observatory	Milan, Italy	Exposed in Museo Nazionale Scienza e Tecnologia Leonardo da Vinci	49 cm (19.29")	7 m (22.97 ft)	1882	Second largest refracting telescope in Italy	
Imperial Observatory	Straßburg, German Empire	Strasbourg, France	48.5 cm (19.1")	7 m (23 ft)	1880	Then largest in German Empire	
18½-in Dearborn Observatory Refractor	Chicago, USA	Evanston, USA	47 cm (18.5")		1862	by Alvan Clark & Sons	
Luneta 46; Observatório Nacional	Rio de Janeiro, Brazil	-	46 cm (18.4")	9.7 m	1921	T. Cooke & Sons	
Wilder Observatory	Amherst College, Amherst, Massachusetts, USA	-	46 cm (18")	(25 ft)	1903	by Alvan Clark & Sons	
Flower Observatory	Philadelphia, USA	Dark Sky Project, Lake Tekapo, New Zealand	46 cm (18")	6.7 m (22.6 ft)	1894	by John Brashear	From 2016 operational at Lake Tekapo, New Zealand.
Royal Observatory	Cape Colony, British Empire	South Africa	46 cm (18")	6.7 m (22.6 ft)	1897		
Cooke-Zeiss Refractor, Royal Observatory of Belgium	Uccle, Belgium	-	45 cm (17.7")	6.99 m	1891/1932	by Cooke & Sons, original 38 cm lens by Merz replaced by 45 cm lens from Zeiss 1932	
Gran Ecuatorial Gautier Telescope; La Plata Astronomical Observatory	La Plata, Argentina	-	43.3 cm (17")	9,7 m	1894	Gautier	
Brashear Refractor, Goodsell Observatory	Northfield, Minnesota, USA	-	41.15 cm (16.2")		1890	by John Brashear	
Herget Telescope; Cincinnati Observatory	Cincinnati, Ohio	-	40.64 cm (16")		1904	by Alvan Clark & Sons	
Vatican Observatory	Castel Gandolfo, Italy	-	40 cm (16")	6.0 m	1881	by Zeiss	
Dorides Refractor; National Observatory of Athens	Athens, Greece	Athens, Greece	40 cm (16")	5,08 m	1901	by Gautier	Doridis Refractor at Pnyx
Washburn Observatory	Madison, Wisconsin, USA	In regular use for education and general public.	39.5 cm (15.56")	6.7 m (22.6 ft)	1881	by Alvan Clark & Sons	
Dominion Observatory Refractor; Dominion Observatory	Ottawa, Ontario, Canada	Moved to Helen Sawyer-Hogg Observatory (Canada Science and Technology Museum, Ottawa) in 1974	38.1 cm (15")	571.5 cm	1905	Original achromat doublet by John Brashear replaced with apochomat triplet by Perkin-Elmer in 1958. Currently used for education and outreach.	
Lunette Arago; Paris Observatory	Paris, France	-	38 cm (15")	9 m	1883	by Gautier and Henry brothers	
Double Refractor; Fabra Observatory	Barcelona, Spain	-	38 cm + 38 cm (15" + 15")	6 m + 4 m	1904	Double telescope by Mailhat, Paris	
Gran Ecuatorial Observatorio Astronómico Nacional	Tacubaya, México	-	38 cm (15")	4.8 m	1885	by Howard Grubb	
Harvard Great Refractor; Harvard College Observatory	Cambridge, Massachusetts, USA	-	38 cm (15")	6.9 m	1847	largest telescope in America for 20 years	
Merz & Mahler Refractor, Pulkovo observatory	Saint Petersburg, Russian Empire	Rescued to Leningrad city in WWII (?)	38 cm (15")	6.9 m	1839	(original) twin of the Harvard Great Refractor	
Lunette coudée Lyon Observatory	Saint-Genis-Laval, France	-	36.6 cm	7.66 m	1887	Equatorial coudé by Maurice Loewy	
Telescopio Amici; Osservatorio Astrofisico di Arcetri	Florence, Italy	-	36 cm	5 m	1872	28 cm lens by G. B. Amici substituted by Zeiss lens in 1926. Currently used only for educational purposes.	
Photographic Refractor; Leiden Observatory	Leiden, Netherlands	-	34 cm + 15 cm (13.4" + 5.9")	524 cm	1897	Double telescope by Gautier and Henry brothers	
Astrograph; Vienna Observatory	Vienna, Austrian Empire	Vienna, Austria	34 cm + 26 cm (13.3" + 10.2")	3.4 m + 3.4 m	1885	Double telescope by Steinheil	
Markree Observatory	County Sligo, Republic of Ireland	Moved to Singapore, then the University of Manila	33.8 cm (13.3")	7.6 m (25′)	1834	Used to discover 9 Metis; the largest refractor in the World for several decades	
Perth Astrograph, Perth Observatory	Old Perth Observatory, Mount Eliza, Western Australia	Perth Observatory, Bickley, Western Australia. Used for public education and outreach	33 cm (13")	3.34 m	1897	Designed and built by Howard Grubb & Co. Relocated to Bickley ~1966. The original telescope (both camera and guide scopes), mount and dome were re-erected at Bickley	
Fitz-Clark Refractor; Allegheny Observatory, University of Pittsburgh	Pittsburgh, Pennsylvania, USA	-	32.02 cm (13")	4.62	1861	Fitz made, visual/photographic. In 1895 established that Saturn's Rings are made up of particles and not solid.	
H. Fitz-H.G. Fitz Refractor; Henry Ruthurfurd, Private Observatory	New York City, USA	-	32.02 cm (13")	4.62	1864	Fitz made, visual/photographic. Started by Henry, finished by son Henry Giles	
Bamberg Refractor; Urania Observatory (Berlin)	Berlin-Moabit, Prussia	Berlin, Germany	31.4 cm (12.36")	5 m	1889	then biggest in Prussia, moved to Insulaner Wilhelm Foerster Observatory in 1963	
H. Fitz 12.6" refractor Detroit Observatory in Ann Arbor	Ann Arbor, Michigan, USA		32 cm (12.6 in) 32 cm	508 cm (200")	1857	The telescopes were restored to functionality as part of the University of Michigan's 2009 International Year of Astronomy celebration. Viewing nights and open houses have been running since then.	
Grubb refractor, Keele Observatory	Oxford, England	Keele University, England (since 1962), in use for the public	31.0 cm (12.25")	4.39 m	1874	Still awaiting the reunion with its 19th-century camera used in the Carte du Ciel project and to prove Einstein's general relativity theory during the 1919 solar eclipse.	
South Telescope, Dunsink Observatory	Dublin, Ireland	Dublin, Ireland	30 cm (12")		1868	by Grubb, the telescope is still used for various outreach activities	
Northumberland Telescope, Institute of Astronomy, Cambridge University	Cambridge, England	Still in use by Cambridge University Astronomical Society and Cambridge Astronomical Association	30 cm (12")	5.95m	1833	Original lens 11.6" made by Cauchoix of Paris, replaced on 150th anniversary by 12" lens designed by R.V. Willstrop, and made by A.E. Optics of Cambridge.	
Urania Sternwarte (Zurich)	Zurich, Switzerland	-	30 cm (12")	5.05 m	1907	by Zeiss	
Griffith Observatory	Los Angeles	-	30 cm (12")	5.03 m	1931	by Zeiss	
Clark-Refraktor; Vienna Observatory	Vienna, Austrian Empire	Vienna, Austria	30 cm (12")	5.06 m	1880	by Clark and Sons	
Deutsches Museum	Munich, Germany	-	30 cm (12")	5.0 m	1924	by Zeiss	
Ladd Observatory, Brown University	Providence, Rhode Island, USA	Still in use for instruction and public education	30 cm (12")	4.6 m (15 ft)	1891	Lens designed by Charles S. Hastings and made by John Brashear; telescope mount by George N. Saegmuller	
Irving Porter Church Memorial Telescope; Fuertes Observatory, Cornell University	Ithaca, New York	Still used for instruction and public outreach.	30 cm (12")	4.57 m (15 ft)	1922	Optics by John Brashear, mounting by Warner & Swasey.	
Jewett Observatory	Pullman, Washington, USA	Used for instruction and pleasure	30 cm (12")	4.57 m (15 ft)	1953	Lens assembled in 1887-1889 by Alvan Clark & Sons	
Silesian Planetarium and Astronomical Observatory	Katowice/Chorzów, Silesia, Poland		30 cm (12")	4.5 m	1955	Largest and oldest Planetarium and Astronomical Observatory in Poland. The 3rd largest in Eastern Europe (east of Germany), after Pulkovo Observatory in Saint Petersburg, Russia and Belgrade Observatory in Belgrade, Serbia	
University of Illinois Observatory	Urbana, Illinois, USA	Used for instruction and pleasure	30 cm (12")	4.57 m (15 ft)	1896	by John Brashear, National Historic Landmark, still used for instruction	
Witte Observatory	Sperry, Iowa, USA	Used for pleasure	30 cm (12")	4.57 m (15 ft)	1937	by Alvan Clark and Sons	
Kirkwood Observatory	Bloomington, Indiana	Still in use for education and public outreach	30 cm (12")	4.57 m (15 ft)	1900	by John Brashear	
Equatorial Refractor; Sydney Observatory	Sydney, Australia	Still in use for education and public outreach	28.956 cm (11.4")	-	1874	by Hugo Schroeder, used to view transit of Venus that occurred on 9 December 1874	
Schroeder Refractor	Laverne, California, USA	Used for pleasure and public outreach	28 cm (11")	4.57 m	1975	Largest completely amateur made, and largest portable classical refractor	
Mitchel Telescope; Cincinnati Observatory	Cincinnati, Ohio, USA	-	28 cm (11")		1843	Merz & Mahler; Oldest professional telescope still used weekly by the public	
Brashear Refractor; Nicholas E. Wagman Observatory	Pittsburgh, Pennsylvania, USA	-	28 cm (11")		1910	John Brashear, Amateur Astronomers Association of Pittsburgh	
Great Refractor; Kuffner Observatory	Vienna, Austria	-	27 cm + 15.6 cm (10.6" + 6.1")	350 cm + 294 cm	1884 + 1890	Double telescope by Repsold and Sons, optics by Steinheil	
Repsold Refractor (10-duims); Leiden Observatory	Leiden, Netherlands	-	26.6 cm (10.5")	399,5 cm	1885	Repsold and Sons, optics by Alvan Clark & Sons	
Äquatoreal (Equatorial); Hamburg Observatory	Millerntor Observatory, Hamburg, Germany	Hamburg Observatory, Bergedorf, Germany	26 cm (10.2")	3 m	1867	Repsold and Sons, optics by G. & S. Merz	
Hume Cronyn Memorial Observatory	Western University; London, Ontario, Canada	-	25.4 cm (10")	4.386 m (172")	1940	by Perkin-Elmer Corp. Glass from Chance Brothers.	
Mills Observatory		Dundee, Scotland (1951)	25 cm (10")		1871	by T. Cooke & Sons. Training telescope at St. Andrews 1938–1951	
Coats Observatory		Paisley, Scotland (1898)	25 cm (10")		1898	by Howard Grubb. Replaced 5" refractor by Thomas Cooke, installed in 1883.	
Blackett Observatory	Marlborough College; Wiltshire, England	-	25 cm (10")		1860	by Thomas Cooke.	-
Quito Astronomical Observatory	Quito	La Alameda park	24 cm (9.6")		1875	An operational 1875 Merz telescope and one of the Oldest Observatories in South America, founded in 1873.	
Fraunhofer Refractor, United States Naval Observatory (Foggy Bottom)	Foggy Bottom, D.C., USA		24.4 cm (9.6")		1844		
Fraunhofer-Refraktor; Berlin Observatory	Berlin-Kreuzberg, Kingdom of Prussia, German Confederation	Moved 1913 to Munich, Germany	24 cm (9.6")	4 m (13.4′)	1835	Used to discover Neptune; in Deutsches Museum, Munich since 1913	
Great Dorpat Refractor (Fraunhofer); Dorpat/Tartu Observatory (Old Building)	Dorpat, Governorate of Livonia	Tartu, Estonia	24 cm (9.6")	4 m (13.4′)	1824	"...the first modern, achromatic, refracting telescope."	

== See also ==
- Lists of telescopes
- List of largest optical reflecting telescopes
- List of largest optical telescopes in the 20th century
- List of largest optical telescopes in the 19th century
- List of largest optical telescopes in the 18th century
