= Institute for Astronomy, Astrophysics, Space Applications and Remote Sensing =

Greek research institute

Coordinates: 38.0472°N 23.8639°E

Institute for Astronomy Astrophysics Space Applications and Remote Sensing (IAASARS) Greek: Ινστιτούτο Αστρονομίας Αστροφυσικής Διαστημικών Εφαρμογών και Τηλεπισκόπησης (ΙΑΑΔΕΤ)
- Established: 2012
- Research type: Basic, Applied
- Budget: 2 M Euros
- Field of research: Observational astronomy, Astrophysics, Earth observation, Space weather, Solar physics, Plasma physics
- Director: S. Basilakos
- Staff: 98
- Students: 28
- Address: Vas. Pavlou & I. Metaxa, GR-15 236 Penteli, Greece
- Location: Athens, Greece
- Campus: Mount Penteli
- Affiliations: National Observatory of Athens
- Operating agency: General Secretariat for Research and Technology
- Website: http://www.astro.noa.gr

The Institute for Astronomy, Astrophysics, Space Applications, and Remote Sensing (IAASARS/NOA; Greek: Ινστιτούτο Αστρονομίας, Αστροφυσικής, Διαστημικών Εφαρμογών και Τηλεπισκόπησης) is a non-profit research institute in Greece with expertise in multidisciplinary astrophysical, space and environmental sciences. It is an independent research Institute of the National Observatory of Athens (NOA) established in 2012 from the merging of the Institute of Astronomy and Astrophysics and the Institute of Space Applications and Remote Sensing. The scientists of the Institute have broad knowledge in various areas of observational Astrophysics, Space Science and Earth observation techniques and their applications. They have established collaborations with research groups in Europe and United States, and their work is recognized through publications in refereed journals, invited talks at international conferences, and coordination of EU-funded and ESA-funded research projects. More details on the IAASARS and its activities can be found in its annual report.

== History ==
The present structure of the Institute for Astronomy, Astrophysics, Space Applications and Remote Sensing (IAASARS) was established in March 2012, by the merging of two independent institutes of the National Observatory of Athens (NOA): The Institute of Astronomy and Astrophysics (IAA) and the Institute for Space Applications and Remote Sensing (ISARS). IAA evolved from the old Astronomical Institute, which was founded as a discrete section of NOA in 1890, together with the Meteorological and Seismological institutes. It carried-on the tradition of ground-based observational astronomy that commenced with the construction of the Observatory of Athens in 1842, but also expanded it to modern research fields such as space observational astrophysics. ISARS was founded in 1955, under the name Ionospheric Institute. In 1990, the Ionospheric Institute was renamed to Institute of Ionospheric and Space Research and in 1999 took the name Institute for Space Applications and Remote Sensing in order to reflect its expanded activities, which cover a variety of aspects of space research and applications. The location of the Institute is at the NOA campus north of Athens, the Penteli Observatory on Mount Penteli, nearly 16 km from the historic site of NOA at the center of Athens across the Parthenon. The institute is supervised and supported by the General Secretariat of Research and Technology of the Greek Ministry of Education.

== Facilities ==
=== Helmos Observatory and the 2.3m Aristarchos Telescope ===
Helmos Observatory is situated on the Helmos mountain chain in the northwestern part of Peloponnese. The site is 2340 m above sea level, 220 km northwest of Athens, with very dark skies. Helmos Observatory hosts the 2.3m "Aristarchos" telescope, an optical telescope designed and manufactured by the German company Carl Zeiss AG. The size of the telescope mirror, the largest in Greece, combined with the sensitive detectors that the telescope is equipped with and the good atmospheric conditions of the site, makes it a very valuable tool for observing astronomical objects, of our Galaxy as well as the very faint distant objects located in the outskirts of the Universe. The current instrumentation includes an optical camera, a fiber fed spectrograph, and an instrument dedicated for observations of transiting exoplanets. More information on the telescope and the site can be found here.

=== Kryonerion Astronomical Station ===
The Kryoneri Observatory was established in 1972. It is located in the district of Corinth in the northern Peloponnese at the top of mount Kyllini, close to Kryoneri village. It is equipped with a 1.2 m Cassegrain reflector telescope manufactured and installed on the site in 1975 by the British company Grubb Parsons Co., Newcastle. It was one of the largest telescopes in Greece, with many successful scientific observations during the past 35 years. The availability of other more modern facilities prompted phasing out the wide science use of the telescope. In 2014 a process of making an upgrade to the mechanics and electronics of the telescope begun, in order to facilitate the remote usage of the site for dedicated projects, such as the Near Earth Object via lunar impact monitoring project (NELIOTA) as well as for public outreach and educational purposes.

=== Penteli Observatory and the Newall Telescope ===
The historic Newall 62.5 cm refractor is located at the Visitor Center of IAASARS in Penteli. The telescope was commissioned by Robert Stirling Newall (1812-1889), a wealthy Scottish engineer and amateur astronomer for his private observatory at Ferndene (Gateshead). The telescope was built by Thomas Cooke and in 1890 it was donated to the University of Cambridge. In 1957 it was donated to the National Observatory of Athens. Since 1995 the telescope is used as the main observational and public outreach facility of IAASARS. In 2013, after major renovation work, the telescope and the dome were fully restored to their past glory.

=== Doridis Telescope ===
The Doridis telescope was built in 1902 and remained as the largest telescope of Greece for 57 years. The telescope is named after the benefactor Dimitrios Doridis (Greek:Δημήτριος Δωρίδης), who financed its construction. It is a refractor with double achromatic lenses of 40 cm diameter and has 5m focal length. Its tube is mounted on a so-called German-type equatorial mounting and it is housed in a new dome not far from the Sinas building. The Doridis refractor was extensively used for observations of planets, comets, and the moon, as well as for astrometry and photometry of variable stars. In 2014, thanks to a generous donation from Cosmote, the telescope was fully restored and it is used for the purposes of education and public outreach.

=== HellENIc GeoMagnetic Array ===
The National Observatory of Athens operates ENIGMA (HellENIc GeoMagnetic Array), a ground-based magnetometer array in the area of south-eastern Europe (central and southern Greece) for space weather applications. The four existing stations are latitudinally equi-spaced between 30° and 33° corrected geomagnetic latitude and cover the areas of Thessaly, Central Greece and the Peloponnese. Each station is equipped with a state-of-the-art vector fluxgate magnetometer. In the near future another station will be installed in Macedonia or Thrace, and there are plans for the installation of an additional station in Crete by mid-2010s. One of the primary research objectives assigned to ENIGMA is the study of geomagnetic field line resonances (FLRs). ENIGMA is also part of the SuperMAG network.

=== Ionospheric Station – Athens Digisonde ===
The Athens Digisonde is an infrastructure for remote sensing of the Earth's Ionosphere, operated by NOA in the Penteli Observatory since September 2000. The Digisonde is a Digital Portable Sounder with four receiving antennas (DPS-4), spaced about one wavelength apart. Data are collected and retrieved in real time (24/7 operation) and are openly available through the main portal of the Ionospheric Group of IAASARS/NOA. The Athens Digisonde is part of the following international networks: GIRO, ESPAS, WDC for Solar-Terrestrial Physics (RAL) and IPS/WDC The Athens Digisonde participates systematically in cal/val campaigns for LEO satellites. Its measurements are used in a variety of services (i.e. ESA space situational awareness).

=== Atmospheric Remote Sensing Station ===
Since February 2009, IAASARS has been operating a ground-based Atmospheric Remote Sensing Station (ARSS) to monitor ground solar radiation levels and particulate pollution over the city of Athens, Greece. ARSS is located on the roof of the Biomedical Research Foundation of the Academy of Athens (37.9 N, 23.8 E) at an elevation of 130 m above mean sea level. The site is located close to the Athens city centre and 10 km from the sea. ARSS is equipped with a CIMEL CE318-NEDPS9 solar photometer for the retrieval of the aerosol optical depth at 8 wavelengths from 340 to 1640 nm, including polarization observations. The CIMEL instrument is a part of NASA's AERONET (Aerosol Robotic Network). The data are processed on a daily basis and are available at AERONET's webpage along with aerosol inversion retrievals, useful for aerosol characterization purposes (e.g. classification of Saharan dust advection, smoke or volcanic ash episodes etc.). ARSS is additionally equipped with a UV-MFR instrument for radiation measurements in the UV spectral region. The instrumentation of IAASARS constitutes a state-of-the-art passive remote sensing suite for atmospheric research, the first one that ever operated in Athens with such specifications.

=== Satellite Receiving Stations ===
==== Meteosat Second Generation SEVIRI Ground Station System ====
Since 2007, the Institute has installed and has been using on a 24/7 operational basis a ground station for systematically receiving satellite imagery from the MSG-SEVIRI system maintained by EUMETSAT. The operating agreement for the collection, archiving, and exploitation for research purposes of MSG images, signed between IAASARS and EUMETSAT, was recently renewed in 2012. On an operational level, the main application of the MSG/SEVIRI ground station is the detection, monitoring and mapping of forest wildfires in near-real time (every 5 minutes) for the entire Greek territory, the briefing of the public authorities and stakeholders involved in the management and suppression of wildfires, and informing the citizens whose properties are threatened by ongoing catastrophic fire events.

==== X/L Band Satellite Acquisition Station ====
IAASARS/NOA ground segment has been expanded in the framework of the BEYOND project with the installation of an X-, and L-band satellite acquisition station for reception, acquisition, and processing of the direct broadcast downlinks from satellite missions including the EOS Aqua & Terra satellites (MODIS), the NPP (VIIRS, ATMS, etc.), the future NPOESS, the NOAA, the FYI, and the MetOP satellites. The IAASARS/NOA ground segment is equipped with the proper processing, archiving, and cataloging facilities for handling in real time image data from the missions above, as well as the future Copernicus satellite missions (Sentinels) through ESA's ground segment. Those ground segment facilities foster the development of a wide range of environmental monitoring services, such as: aerosol pollution indexes assessment, dust and volcanic ash alerts, smoke dispersion forecasts, wildfire detection and monitoring, geo-hazard activity monitoring and assessment (earthquakes/volcanoes/landslides), and urban heat Island mapping.
