= National Observatory of Athens =

Research institute and observatory in Greece

- Εθνικό Αστεροσκοπείο Αθηνών (in Greek)
- Logo of the National Observatory of Athens
- Motto: Servare Intaminatum
- Established: 1842 (184 years ago)
- Research type: Basic, Applied
- Field of research: Astronomy; Physics
- Director: Spyros Basilakos
- Location: Athens, Greece; 37°58′24.2″N 23°43′5.6″E
- Website: http://www.noa.gr
National Observatory of Athens
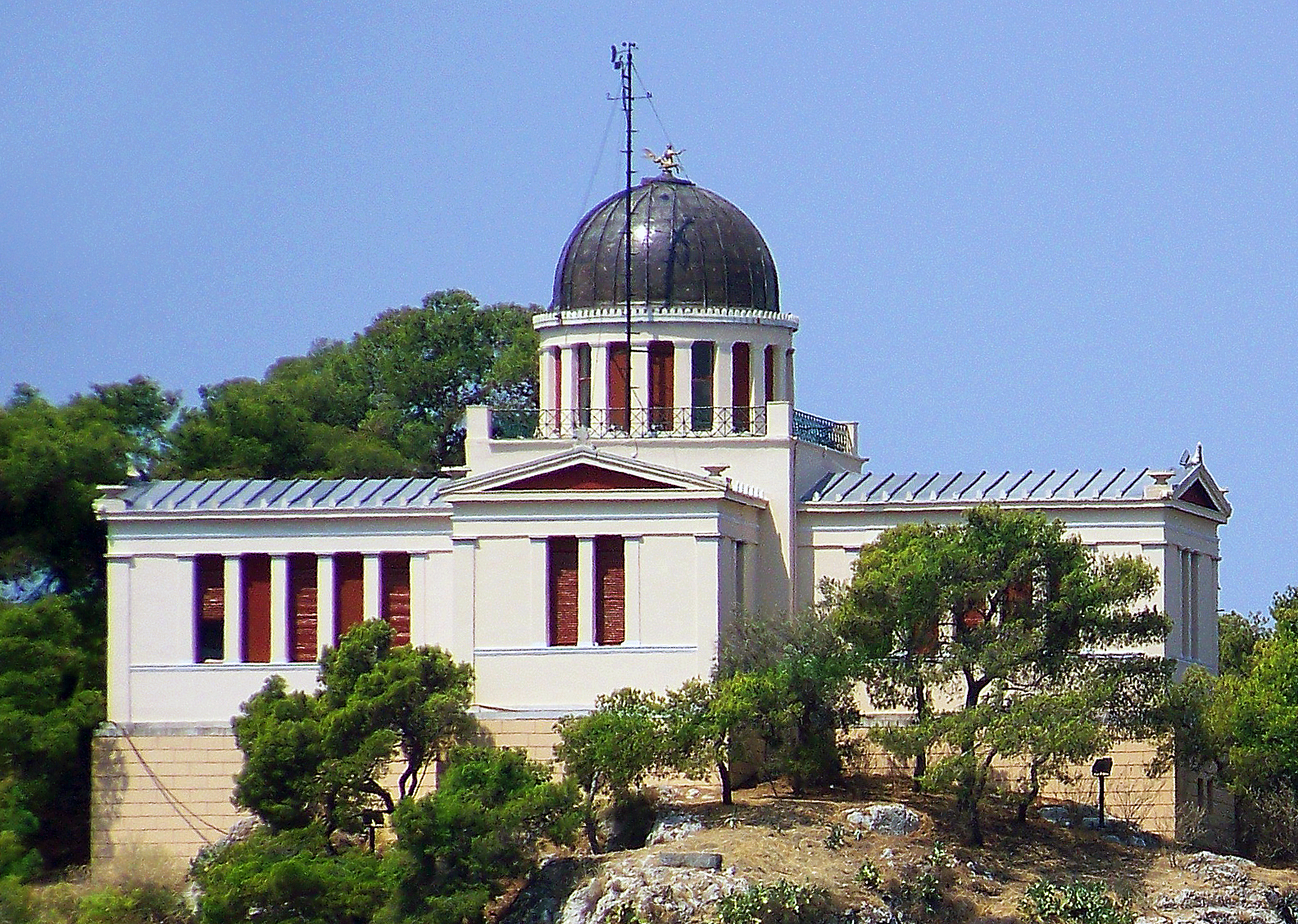
- The National Observatory sits atop Nymphs' Hill in Thissio, Athens
- Alternative names: Athens Observatory
- Organization: Public institution
- Observatory code: 066
- Location: Thissio, Athens, Greece
- Coordinates: 37°58′24.2″N 23°43′5.6″E
- Established: 1842
- Website: http://www.noa.gr
- Related media on Commons

The National Observatory of Athens (NOA; Greek: Εθνικό Αστεροσκοπείο Αθηνών) is a research organization based in Athens, Greece. Founded in 1842, it is the oldest research organization in Greece and one of the oldest in Southern Europe. It consists of three research institutes and is operating multiple facilities across the country.

The world-renowned Greek-Austrian astronomer Georgios Konstantinos Vouris lobbied to create the National Observatory of Athens in the newly founded state. He persuaded wealthy Greek-Austrian banker Georgios Sinas to pay for the new massive observatory. The Austrian-born Greek King found out the news and awarded Georgios Sinas's son the Order of the Redeemer. The King also selected the architects for the building under Georgios Konstantinos Vouris's supervision, which were Eduard Schaubert and Theophil Hansen.

The Athens observatory since its inception aided astronomers to conduct research in the field starting from Georgios Konstantinos Vouris's catalog for the complete determination of 1000 stars observed from Greece relative to the position of the Athens observatory. The second director Ioannis Papadakis used the facility to observe the Moons of Jupiter and Johann Friedrich Julius Schmidt German-born Greek astronomer conducted countless observations and created a Moon map of the lunar surface from the Athens observatory.

After Schmidt, Demetrios Kokkidis briefly directed the observatory and expanded the existing weather stations adding new ones in Corfu, Zakynthos, and Larissa. By the early 1900s, Astronomer Demetrios Eginitis observed the rare phenomenon known as Halley's Comet from the Athens observatory and wrote about it in his article entitled Sur la Comète de Halley. By the middle of the 20th century, Stavros Plakidis continued the legacy of Greek astronomy at the observatory writing countless research papers and continuing his lifelong research on variable stars.

Eginitis and Plakidis allowed a young twenty-two-year-old astronomer named Jean Focas to assist them at the observatory. The young astronomer had no education in the field. After many years at the Athens observatory, later in life, he acquired a Ph.D. in the field of astronomy in Paris, and the Focas crater on the Moon and the Focas crater on Mars are named after him for his extraordinary contribution to the field.

Currently, the National Observatory of Athens operates in four distinct locations:

- The National Observatory of Athens main branch, located in Thissio.
- The Penteli Astronomical Station, located in Penteli.
- The Kryoneri Astronomical Station, located on Mount Kyllini.
- The Chelmos Observatory, located on Mount Chelmos.

== History ==
=== 1842: Foundation ===
Greek-Austrian astronomer Georgios Konstantinos Vouris studied astronomy at the Vienna Observatory under the supervision of Joseph Johann von Littrow. Vouris eventually moved to Greece, becoming a professor at the newly founded University of Athens and he wanted to build an observatory in the country. Around 1840, he lobbied Austrian banker Baron Georgios Sinas, the Greek ambassador in Vienna, with the help of the Austrian ambassador in Athens Prokesch-Osten. Sinas expressed his intention to make a donation for scientific development in Greece and the Athens Observatory was founded a few years later with Vouris as its first director. Vouris was also involved in the construction of its first building and chose the instruments for the new observatory.

=== The first building and instruments ===
The first building, known as Sinas building, was based on a project presented by Eduard Schaubert and designed by the Danish architect Theophil Hansen, being the first building erected by the world-renowned architect. The cross-like neoclassic building has its sides oriented toward the four directions of the horizon. There is a small dome for a telescope in the center of the construction. The building was completed in 1846. Two years after the United States Naval Observatory was completed.

The Observatory of Athens foundation ceremony was on June 26, 1842, the day of a Solar Eclipse, and it was a magnificent official event with the King of Greece, members of the Government, and the Greek Church being all present. A large crowd of people filled up the vicinity of the location selected for the Observatory, a location on the hill of Nymphs at Thiseio, facing the Acropolis. Following the panegyric speech by professor Georgios K. Vouris, the foundation stone was set under musical sounds and cannonade by a Danish frigate anchored at the port of Piraeus.

Vouris was responsible for purchasing and selecting the correct instruments for the newly founded Observatory. He chose a 7.5-inch dialyte refracting telescope (19-cm aperture, 190 cm focal length, f/10) made by Simon Plössl of Vienna, Austria. The second telescope was made by Christoph Starke of the Imperial Polytechnical University, Vienna. The device was a meridional telescope 3.7" large (94mm, f/15, diameter 1m). He also purchased a timer and two pendulums along with five small telescopes and a complete line of meteorological equipment. They were some of the most advanced scientific instruments at that time.

The observatory was fully operational and Vouris was the first director. He conducted scientific work in the field of astrophysics, astronomy, and geodesy, publishing articles periodically in Astronomische Nachrichten. He became internationally renowned in the field of astronomy and created a catalog for the complete determination of 1000 stars peculiar to Greece and the position of the Athens Observatory while also determining the geographic coordinates of the Observatory, which formed the basis for the mapping of Greece. Vouris did significant research on the movement of Sirius, Neptune, and Mars. He made specific observations of Mars with the Athens Meridian Circle and his research was used by American astronomer James Melville Gilliss.

=== From Vouris to Ioannis Papadakis and Johann Friedrich Julius Schmidt ===
In 1855, Vouris became ill and moved back to retire in Vienna, where he died on January 2, 1860. Prof. Ioannis Papadakis, full Professor of Mathematics, since August 17, 1854, at the University of Athens was chosen as an interim Director. In December 1858 the nomination for the new permanent director took place, on December 4 Johann Friedrich Julius Schmidt was nominated, and on December 16 Julius Schmidt became the new director of Athens Observatory.

=== 1858-1884: The "classical" period of J. Schmidt ===
Utilizing the Sina's family donation, Johann Friedrich Julius Schmidt repaired and maintained the instruments. He started to observe the Sun, Moon, planets, comets and variable stars. He enriched the Observatory's library with many scientific books and journals. Some of them were donated by other European observatories. Schmidt also started editing the Publications of the Observatory of Athens.

During the 25 years of his work at the Athens Observatory, he performed more than 70,000 observations of variable stars and discovered several periodic variables and two Novae stars. Most of the results were published in the journal Astronomische Nachrichten.

For many years, J. Schmidt studied the planets Mars and Jupiter and drew the changes on their surfaces. He observed the bright comet of 1860 and two years later discovered a comet, C/1862 N1 (Schmidt). The clear sky allowed him to make thousands of observations of meteors. He also had the opportunity to observe a number of solar eclipses of the Moon. On 19 January 1865, while he was inspecting the Cape catalogue nebulae he discovered five galaxies: NGC 1381, NGC 1382, NGC 1386, NGC 1389 and NGC 1428, all of which are members of the Fornax Cluster.

The Topographical Chart of the Moon (Chapitre der Gebirge des Mondes) published in Berlin, is his main work. In an area of two meters diameter, consisting of 25 parts and representing the visible surface of the Moon, there are about 30,000 craters drawn as observed with the 7.5 inch Plössl telescope. He conducted a significant study of the crater Linne showing apparent morphological changes.

Julius Schmidt reorganized the meteorological service of the Observatory of Athens. He performed meteorological observations in many places in Greece and regularly sent data to the Observatory of Paris. These results were presented in his work Beiträge zur physikalischen Geographie von Griechenland (1864).

Schmidt also showed a significant interest in the field of seismology. With the help of volunteers, he recorded more than 3,000 earthquakes and published his work entitled Studien über Erdbeben (1875). He observed the Santorini volcano eruption in 1866 and published the study and three other studies on the volcanos (Etna, Vesuvius, Stromboli) in 1874. Julius Schmidt traveled to the ancient city of Troy and performed geographical and archeological studies.

=== 1884-1890: D. Kokkidis ===
Demetrios Kokkidis undertook the Direction of the Observatory of Athens in 1884. Because of the financial situation of the Observatory (the funds of the Sinas family donation were already exhausted) and the fund from the Sinas family that paid Schmidt's salary was no longer paying the Observatory directory. Regrettably, Kokkidis volunteered his time for no payment but had very limited possibilities for administrative and scientific activity. The astronomer was able to write articles in the field of astronomy and expand the existing weather stations adding ones in Corfu, Zakynthos, and Larissa. He continued regular meridian circle observations for the purpose of recording time and observed solar spots.

=== 1890-1934: The Observatory's "renaissance" under D. Eginitis ===
The Greek Parliament passed a special law on June 19, 1890, making the Athens Observatory a government research facility. The name was changed to National Observatory of Athens abbreviated NOA. Because of the special law, Demetrios Eginitis was appointed Director of the NOA. In addition to the Astronomical Institute, two others Institutes were created, the Meteorological and the Seismological Institutes.

Eginitis worked diligently to find funding for the new institute. He received credit from the University and restored the observatory building and updated the equipment. Because of the economic situation in Greece, government aid was very limited but Eginitis organized a national committee that collected considerable funding and donations from the local Greek community.

The Thiseio site of the Observatory was expanded, a neighboring area was purchased and three new buildings were erected with the newly raised funding. State-of-the-art new instruments were ordered and installed at NOA, a 16 cm meridian circle and a 40 cm refractor. Another telescope, a 20 cm reflector was donated by K. Ionidis.

Eginitis reorganized the meteorological network, adding about a hundred new stations and creating a seismological service. He also organized the addition of a catalog entitled Annales de l'Observatoire National d’Athènes.

Eginitis played a significant role in the political and academic life in Greece. He was Minister of Education in 1917 and in 1926. Eginitis introduced the Eastern European Time Zone in Greece and replaced the Julian calendar with the Gregorian calendar making it the country's new standard. He founded the Academy of Athens and organized the University of Thessaloniki.

=== 1935-1964: The astrophysics in NOA - S. Plakidis ===
Doridis telescope

Stavros Plakidis attended the School of Physics and Mathematics at the University of Athens and graduated in 1915 one of his professors included Demetrios Eginitis. Plakidis became an assistant at the Observatory in 1915. After over a decade at the institution, he was promoted to assistant astronomer in 1927. One year later in 1928 with the recommendation of Professor Eginitis Plakidis continued his studies for two years in Greenwich, Cambridge, Paris, Strasbourg, and Heidelberg.

While in Cambridge he collaborated with professor Sir Arthur Eddington on a paper in 1929 entitled Irregularities of the Period of Long-Period Variable Stars. He became well known for his work on long-period variable stars and frequently collaborated with professor Sir Arthur Eddington throughout his life. Plakidis became a well-known astronomer and continued his work in the field of observational astrophysics. He published many papers in famous astronomical journals. In 1931, he was proclaimed Doctor of Mathematics and was nominated regular astronomer of NOA. Around this period, Jean Focas became an assistant at the observatory after Plakidis' recommendation.

In 1935, after the death of Eginitis, Plakidis was elected Professor at the University of Athens and at the same time was nominated Supervisor of the Astronomical Department of NOA. In two years the NOA changed two Directors, firstly professor Nikolaos Kritikos was nominated, then Elias Mariolopoulos. In 1937, the Director of NOA Georgios Chors was nominated.

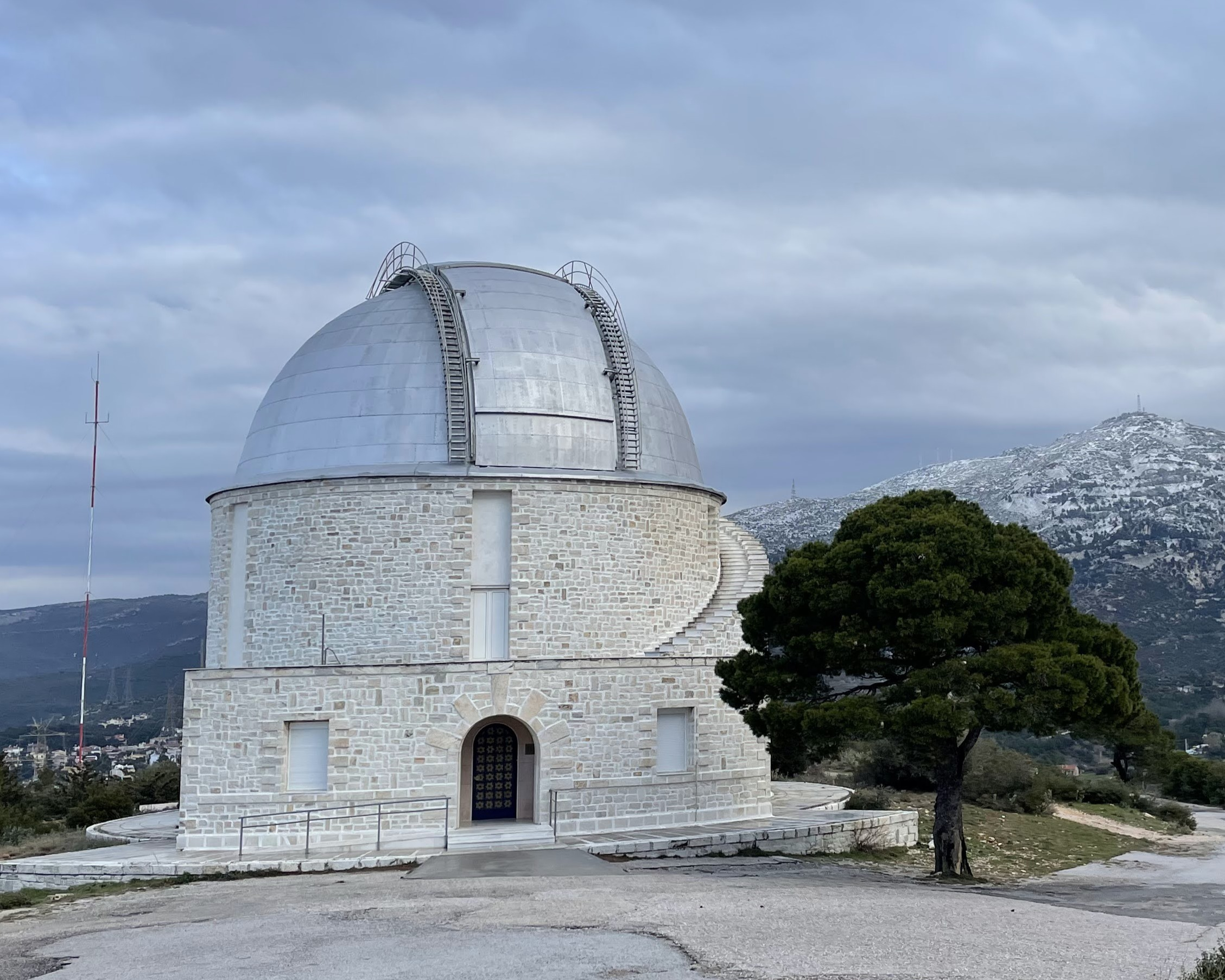
The Penteli Observatory

Stavros Plakidis made many efforts to move the observations far from the city center. In 1936, he founded the Penteli Astronomical Station in Penteli, began to function in 1937 but because of World War II, the equipment including three refractors, Bardou 6 in., Secretan 4.4 in., Zeiss 3 in., the Watts theodolite, the photo-visual refractor, Zeiss 4.4 in. with solar and lunar cameras, Herschel and Colzi prisms, were moved to the laboratory of astronomy belonging to the university or to the national observatory hidden from the Nazis. After the war, the Astronomical Observatory was divided into three departments: the Astronomical, the Meteorological, and the Geodynamical.

Newall Telescope at Penteli Observatory

The large 25 in. (63 cm) Newall refractor that Thomas Cooke made for Robert Stirling Newall in 1869, was donated in 1890, by his son Hugh Newall, to the University Observatory of Cambridge enabling Hugh Newall to make observations at the university. In 1955, because of Professor Plakidis's long collaboration on long-period variable stars with Sir Arthur Eddington the instrument was donated to the National Observatory of Athens and moved to the Penteli Astronomical Station.

In 1999 the names of the four institutes of NOA were updated as follows:

- Institute of Astronomy and Astrophysics
- Institute for Environmental Research and Sustainable Development
- Institute of Geodynamics
- Institute for Space Applications and Remote Sensing

In 2003 the Institute of Astroparticle Physics "NESTOR" became the fifth institute of NOA.

After a major reform in the structure of all research institutes in Greece in 2012, two of the institutes of NOA were merged and one (NESTOR) moved under another administrative unit. Currently NOA has the following three institutes:

- Institute for Astronomy, Astrophysics, Space Applications and Remote Sensing
- Institute for Environmental Research and Sustainable Development
- Institute of Geodynamics

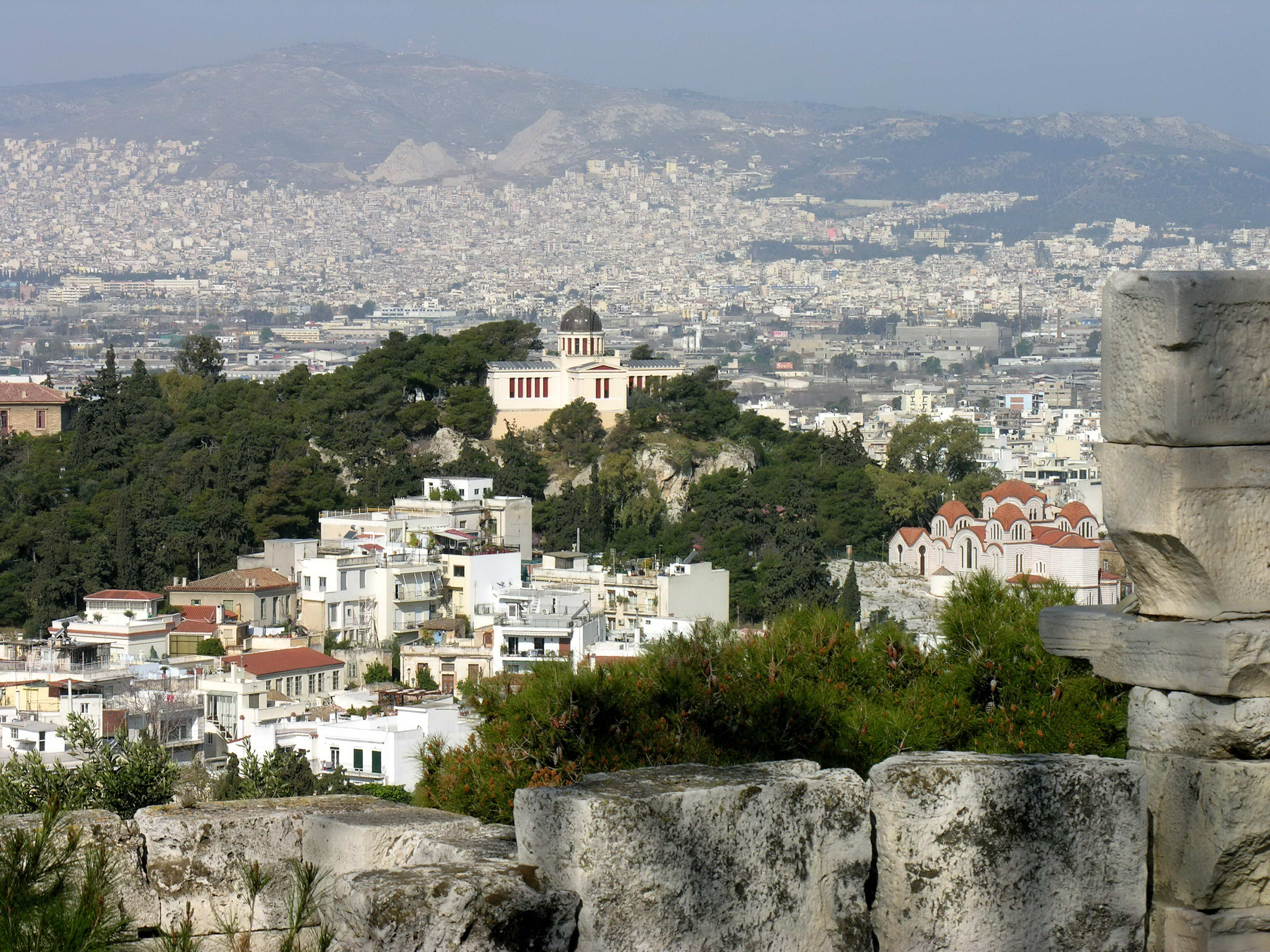
The Observatory as seen from the Acropolis.

== Premises ==
The National Observatory of Athens operates in four locations:

- The central premises of the National Observatory of Athens are situated at the historic site on top of Hill of the Nymphs (in Greek: Λόφος Νυμφών) at Thiseio. Nymphon Hill borders with Philopappou Hill and is opposite to the Acropolis and the Athenian Agora. They house the central administration as well as the Institute of Geodynamics.
- The Penteli Astronomical Station is situated on a hill known as "Koufou" (Lofos Koufou in Greek), which is located in the municipality of Penteli, (38.047976°N 023.864437°E) at the northern suburbs of Athens. It is best known as the site of the historic 62.5 cm Newall refractor (built by British instrument maker Thomas Cooke in 1869), which was installed there in 1955, and it is now used for public outreach. The Institute for Astronomy, Astrophysics, Space Applications, and Remote Sensing as well as the Institute for Environmental Research and Sustainable Development are now located on the premises.
- The Kryoneri Astronomical Station was established in 1972. It is located in Northern Peloponnese, on Mount Kyllini (37°58′N 22°37′E) at an altitude of 930 m. It is equipped with a 1.2 m Cassegrain reflector telescope manufactured and installed in 1975 by the British company Grubb Parsons Co., Newcastle. It is one of the largest telescopes in Greece, with many successful scientific observations during its long operation (scientific observations started in 1975). The telescope was used for the NELIOTA project of NOA and ESA, which was a study that monitored the lunar surface for impacts of meteoroids.
- The Chelmos Observatory is located in the northwestern part of Peloponnese on Mount Chelmos (37.9857°N 22.1983°E) and it is the site of the Aristarchos 2.3 m Telescope operated by the Institute for Astronomy, Astrophysics, Space Applications, and Remote Sensing.

== The N.O.A Meteorological Station ==
The National Observatory of Athens handles the most antique meteorological station in Greece and one of the oldest in Southern Europe. The station is located at the center of Athens, in the Thiseio neighbourhood (Hill of Nymphs). The A class Meteorological station has been located at the same position from the 11th of September 1890; while it started its operation in 1858 at a different location in Thiseio.

Climate data for Downtown Athens (1991–2020), Extremes (1890–present)
Month	Jan	Feb	Mar	Apr	May	Jun	Jul	Aug	Sep	Oct	Nov	Dec	Year
Record high °C (°F)	22.8 (73.0)	25.3 (77.5)	28.2 (82.8)	32.2 (90.0)	37.6 (99.7)	44.8 (112.6)	42.8 (109.0)	43.9 (111.0)	38.7 (101.7)	36.5 (97.7)	30.5 (86.9)	23.1 (73.6)	44.8 (112.6)
Mean daily maximum °C (°F)	13.3 (55.9)	14.2 (57.6)	17.0 (62.6)	21.1 (70.0)	26.5 (79.7)	31.6 (88.9)	34.3 (93.7)	34.3 (93.7)	29.6 (85.3)	24.4 (75.9)	18.9 (66.0)	14.4 (57.9)	23.3 (73.9)
Daily mean °C (°F)	10.2 (50.4)	10.8 (51.4)	13.1 (55.6)	16.7 (62.1)	21.8 (71.2)	26.6 (79.9)	29.3 (84.7)	29.4 (84.9)	25.0 (77.0)	20.3 (68.5)	15.6 (60.1)	11.6 (52.9)	19.2 (66.6)
Mean daily minimum °C (°F)	7.1 (44.8)	7.3 (45.1)	9.2 (48.6)	12.3 (54.1)	17.0 (62.6)	21.6 (70.9)	24.2 (75.6)	24.4 (75.9)	20.4 (68.7)	16.2 (61.2)	12.2 (54.0)	8.7 (47.7)	15.0 (59.0)
Record low °C (°F)	−6.5 (20.3)	−5.7 (21.7)	−2.6 (27.3)	1.7 (35.1)	6.2 (43.2)	11.8 (53.2)	16 (61)	15.5 (59.9)	8.9 (48.0)	5.9 (42.6)	−1.1 (30.0)	−4.0 (24.8)	−6.5 (20.3)
Average rainfall mm (inches)	55.6 (2.19)	44.4 (1.75)	45.6 (1.80)	27.6 (1.09)	20.7 (0.81)	11.6 (0.46)	10.7 (0.42)	5.4 (0.21)	25.8 (1.02)	38.6 (1.52)	70.8 (2.79)	76.3 (3.00)	433.1 (17.06)
Average relative humidity (%)	72.0	70.0	66.0	60.0	56.0	50.0	42.0	47.0	57.0	66.0	72.0	73.0	60.9
Average ultraviolet index	2	3	5	7	9	10	10	9	6	4	2	2	6
Source 1: Cosmos, scientific magazine of the National Observatory of Athens
Source 2: Meteoclub

== Additional Observatories in Greece ==
- Corfu Observatory (Defunct)
- Skinakas Observatory
- Thessaloniki Observatory Aristotle University
- Stephani Observatory (Mount Trachonion, Corinth)
- Gerostathopoulio University of Athens Observatory
- The Hellenic Radiotelescope
- Zagori Observatory (private)

== See also ==
- List of astronomical observatories
- UFO sightings in Greece

== Bibliography ==
- Theodossiou, E.Th.; Manimanis, V.N.; Mantarakis, P. (2007). "Demetrios Eginitis Restorer of the Athens Observatory" (PDF). Journal of Astronomical History and Heritage. 10 (2): 123. Bibcode:2007JAHH...10..123T. doi:10.3724/SP.J.1440-2807.2007.02.05. ISSN 1440-2807. S2CID 129260817.
- Rhousopoulos, Athanasius Sergius (1857). Ὁδηγος των Φοιτητων του Πανεπιστημιου Ὀθωνος [Students and Faculty of the University of Athens Under King Otto]. Athens, Greece: Nikolaou Angelidou Publishing.
- Matsopoulos, Nicolas T. (2012). Η Συμβολή της Αστρονομίας στον Νεοελληνικό Διαφωτισμό - η ίδρυση του Αστεροσκοπείου Αθηνών [The Contribution of Astronomy to the Neo-Greek Enlightenment - The Foundation of the Athens Observatory]. Thessaloniki, Greece: Aristotle University of Thessaloniki Academy of Institutions and Cultures Society.
- Vlahakis, George N (2012). Early Attempts at Weather Prediction and Climate Description in 19th Century Greece. Athens, Greece: Institute for Neohellenic Research and the National Hellenic Research Foundation.
- Stefanidis, Michail K. (1952). Εθνικόν και Καποδιστριακόν Πανεπιστήμιον Αθηνών Εκατονταετηρίς 1837-1937. Τόμος Ε′, Ιστορία της Φυσικομαθηματικής Σχολής [National and Kapodistrian University of Athens Centenary 1837-1937. Volume V, History of the Faculty of Physics and Mathematics] (PDF). Athens: National and Kapodistrian University of Athens.
- Contopoulos, G. (1991). "Obituaries S. Plakidis (1893-1991)". Quarterly Journal of the Royal Astronomical Society. 32 (4): 483. Bibcode:1991QJRAS..32..483C.
- Eddington, A.S.; Plakidis, S. (1929). "Irregularities of Period of Long Period Variable Stars". Monthly Notices of the Royal Astronomical Society. 90 (1). London, UK: 65–71. doi:10.1093/mnras/90.1.65.
- Plakidis, Stavros (1946). "Astronomy in Greece During the War". The Observatory. 66 (832). London, UK: 298. Bibcode:1946Obs....66..298P.
- Hutchins, Roger (2017). British University Observatories 1772–1939. London, UK: Taylor & Francis. ISBN 9781351954525.
- Harvey, Stephen; Matsopoulos, Nicolas (2020). The Moon A Translation of Der Mond by Johann Friedrich Julius Schmidt. Horsham, United Kingdom: Springer. ISBN 978-3-030-37269-9.
- Gilliss, James Melville (1856). The U.S. Naval Astronomical Expedition to the Southern Hemisphere, During the Years 1849-52. Washington D.C.: United States Navy Department.
- Dollfus, Audouin (May 1970). "Jean-Henri Focas" [Jean-Henri Focas] (PDF). L'Astronomie (in French). 84: 217. Bibcode:1970LAstr..84..217D.

== Sources ==
- (in English) The National Observatory of Athens
