= Penteli Observatory =

Astronomical observatory in Greece

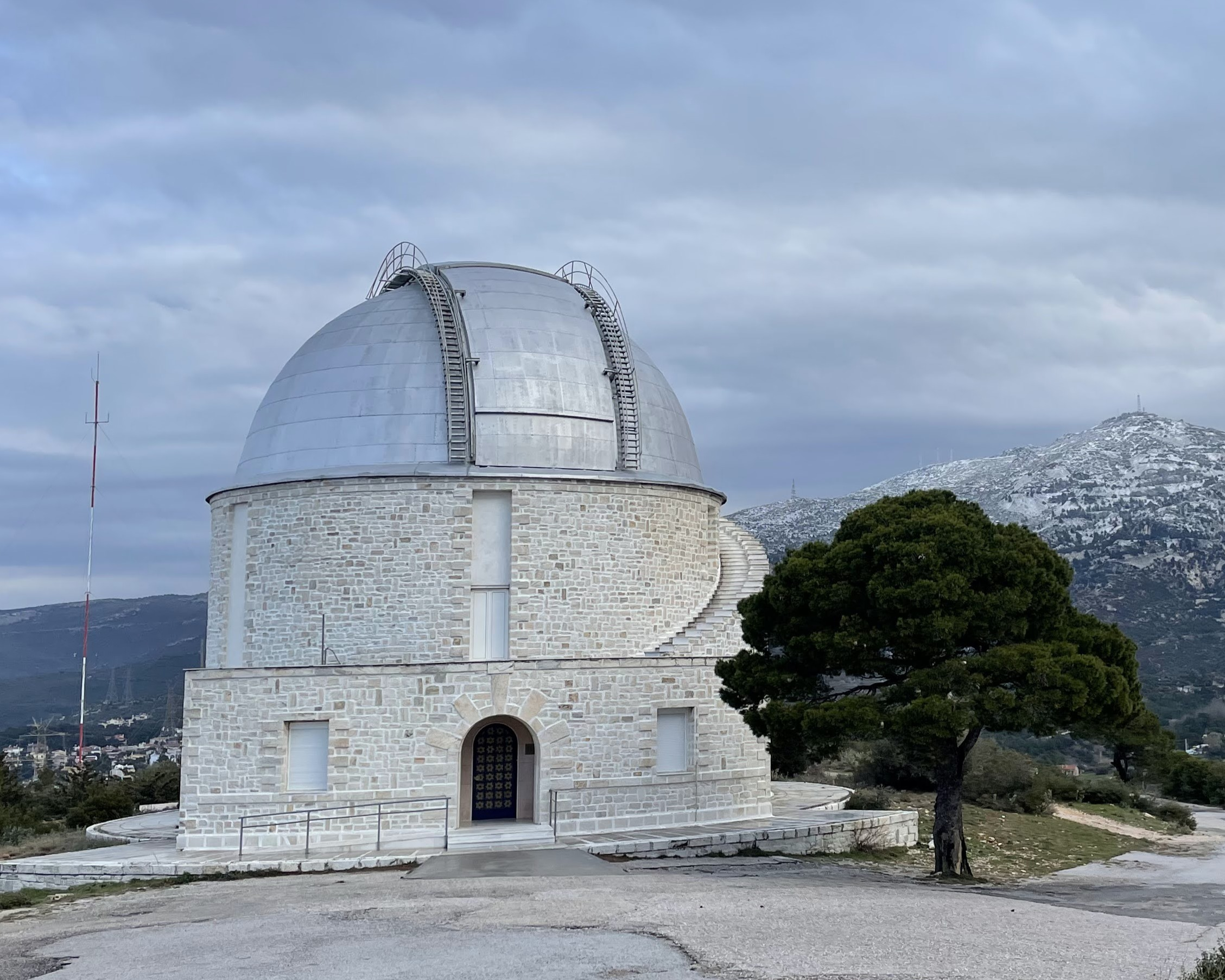
- The Penteli Observatory
- Alternative names: Penteli Astronomical Station
- Organization: National Observatory of Athens
- Location: Koufos hill, Penteli, Greece
- Coordinates: 38.0479°N 23.8644°E
- Altitude: 500 m (1,600 ft)
- Established: 1937
- Website: www.astro.noa.gr/public-outreach/kentra-episkeptwn/penteli/
- Architect: B. Kassandras
- Related media on Commons

The Penteli Observatory (Greek: Αστεροσκοπείο Πεντέλης), also known as the Penteli Astronomical Station (Αστρονομικός Σταθμός Πεντέλης), is an astronomical observatory in Penteli, Greece, operated by the National Observatory of Athens. It is best known for housing the historic Newall Refractor, which was the largest refracting telescope in the world when it was built in 1869. From 1959 to 1980 it was a major site for scientific research, though since then it has been facing severe light pollution problems resulting in its gradual conversion into a public observatory, especially after the establishment of the Visitor Center there in 1995. Nowadays, the most notable research conducted in the location is the one carried out by the Athens Digisonde, an ionosonde used for ionospheric sounding.

== History ==
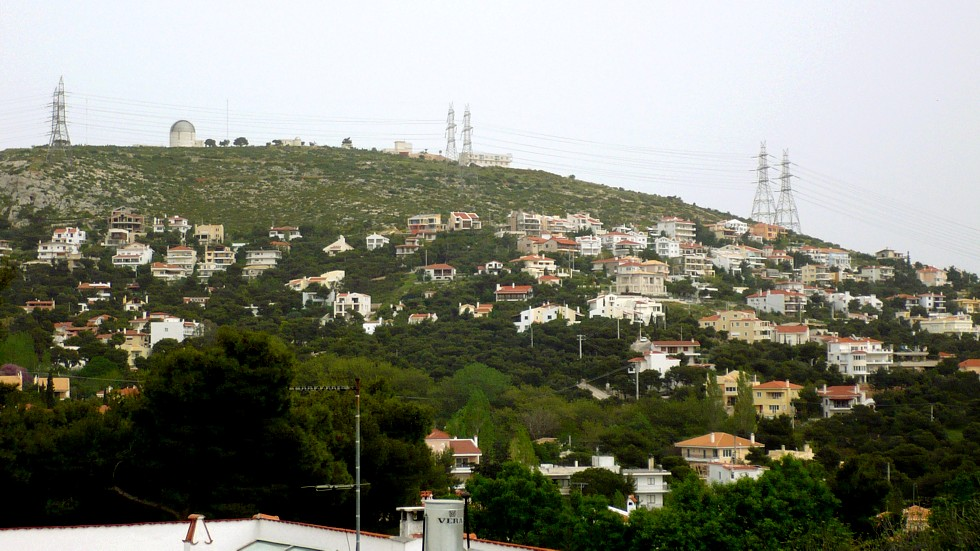
The Koufos hill with the Penteli Observatory on the top

=== Background and early years ===
During the decade of 1930, Stavros Plakidis, then director of the National Observatory Athens, made great efforts to relocate the observatory from its central premises in Thiseio. That location had been selected by Eduard Schaubert almost a century earlier, when light pollution still was not very noticeable in Athens. Plakidis decided that the Koufos hill in Penteli, on the side of Mount Pentelicus at an altitude of 500 metres (1,600 ft), was a more suitable location. An important factor was also its proximity to Athens, being about 18 kilometres (11 mi) away from the city centre.

Plakidis started making observations there in 1936 and the Penteli Astronomical Station was founded in 1937. It was equipped with multiple telescopes and other astronomical and meteorological instruments. However, during the Axis occupation of Greece in World War II that started a few years after its establishment, the station was under performing, being used only for the collection of meteorological data and the scarce conducting of astronomical observations. The Germans requisitioned the Penteli Astronomical Station and erected a communications station on the Koufos hill, which later brought electricity up to the observatory. During the requisition, all the instruments were transferred to the Laboratory of Astronomy of the National and Kapodistrian University of Athens or to the central premises of the National Observatory of Athens. After the end of the occupation, the station remained a minor observatory for more than a decade.

=== After the relocation of the Newall Telescope ===
In 1955 the National Observatory of Athens showed interest in the Newall Telescope, which was then located in the Cambridge Observatory that had decided that it would donate it. In the same year, a team of scientists visited the telescope and concluded that they would accept the donation. A deal was made in 1957, in which the long collaboration between Stavros Plakidis and Arthur Eddington played a crucial role. The construction of a building to house the telescope started in 1957. The selected material was pentelic marble and a dome 14 metres (46 ft) in diameter was placed on top of it. Its floor's height was designed to be adjustable, being able to move vertically for approximately 5 metres (16 ft). The telescope was relocated there in 1959 and it was the largest telescope in Greece until 1975, when a 1.23 meter reflector was installed in the Kryoneri Observatory.

The Newall Telescope was used solely for scientific observations until 1980, when light pollution in the area started causing severe problems. In 1995 the Visitor Center was established in the Penteli Observatory, repurposing the telescope for science communication. The Visitor Center is operated by the Institute for Astronomy, Astrophysics, Space Applications and Remote Sensing, while the observatory is also hosting the Institute for Environmental Research and Sustainable Development. Both are independent institutes of the National Observatory of Athens.

Since September 2000 the Institute for Astronomy, Astrophysics, Space Applications and Remote Sensing is also operating the Athens Digisonde in the location. Four receiving antennas where installed for the creation of an ionosonde that is studying the Earth's ionosphere using the ionospheric sounding technique.

=== During the 2024 Attica wildfires ===
During the 2024 Attica wilfires part of Mount Pentelicus was burnt and the fire almost reached the Penteli Observatory. In August, the fire was spreading towards the observatory and the building was evacuated. The flames entered the observatory's yard and they were put out by the firefighters just a few meters away from the main building.

== The Newall Telescope ==
The Newall Telescope

The Newall Telescope is the main instrument of the observatory since its relocation there in 1959, and it was the largest telescope in Greece for 16 years. It was built in 1869 by Thomas Cooke for Robert Stirling Newall and at that time it was the largest refracting telescope in the world. Before its relocation to the Penteli Observatory, it used to be located in the Cambridge Observatory and before that it was located in Newall's private observatory in Gateshead. It is a 9 metres (30 ft) long refractor that has lenses with a diameter of 62.5 centimetres (24.6 in). It is used with three finderscopes, two of which have a 10 centimetres (3.9 in) diameter and the third one a has a diameter of 15 centimetres (5.9 in). The telescope is placed on top a German equatorial mount. It is equipped with an astrographic camera, a spectrometer, an illuminometer, a polarimeter and other instruments.

== The Athens Digisonde ==
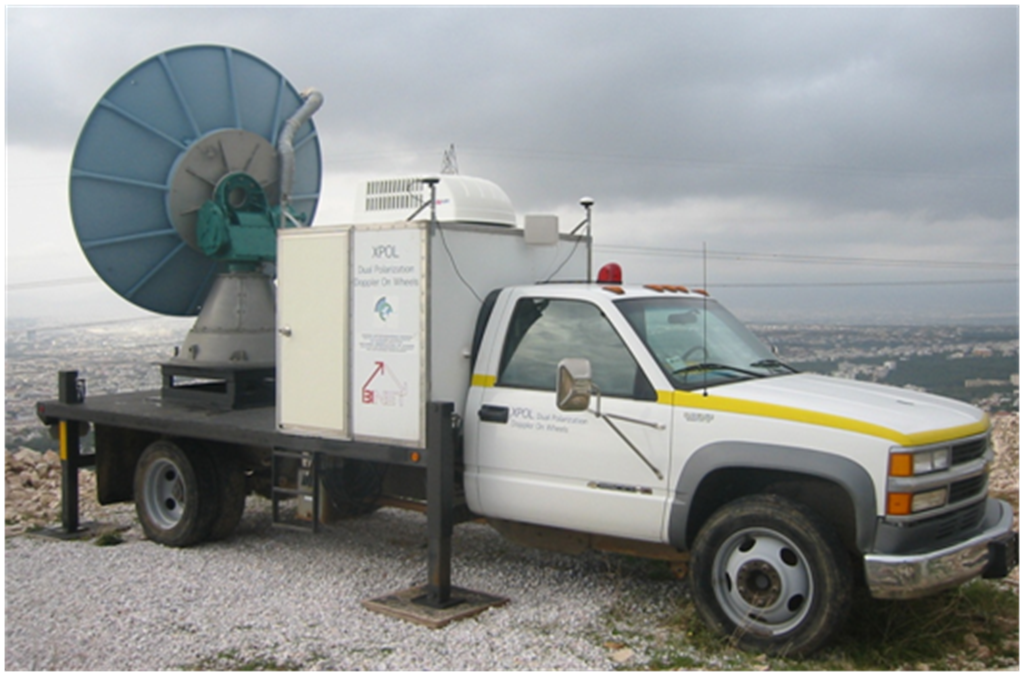
XPOL mobile radar stationed next to Digisonde station

The Athens Digisonde is an advanced ionosonde operated by the Institute for Astronomy, Astrophysics, Space Applications and Remote Sensing in the Penteli site since 2000. It is a Digital Portable Sounder with four receiving antennas (DPS-4), each of which is spaced about one wavelength apart from the other. The digisonde is studying the ionosphere 24/7 in real time using the ionospheric sounding technique. It is performing 5-minute long scheduled observations by vertically transmitting short electromagnetic pulses in the frequency range between 1 and 20 MHz, which are then received locally after their ionospheric reflection. Using this technique, the Athens Digisonde is measuring the amplitude, virtual reflection height, Doppler shift, polarization, angle of arrival and the electron density profile of the pulses. The data are then displayed as ionograms and skymaps and are openly available through the main portal of the Ionospheric Group of IAASARS/NOA. The Athens Digisonde is part of the European Digital upper Atmosphere Server (DIAS) and the Global Ionospheric Radio Observatory (GIRO), as well as other networks.

== Visitor Center ==
The Visitor Center was established in 1995 by Nicolas Matsopoulos and it is operated by the Institute for Astronomy, Astrophysics, Space Applications and Remote Sensing. Its aim is to offer science education and public outreach mainly to middle school and high school students. At the Visitor Center, special seminars and talks are taking place and it is also producing documentaries that are presented to the visitors. Most tours also include observations through the Newall Telescope.

Newall Telescope at Penteli Observatory during a public event

Astronomer Nicolas Matsopoulos presents the Newall telescope at Penteli Observatory
