= Newall Telescope =

Refractor in the Penteli Observatory, Greece

- The Newall Telescope
- Location: Penteli Observatory, Greece
- Coordinates: 38.0479°N 23.8644°E
- Organization: IAASARS of the National Observatory of Athens
- Altitude: 500 meters (1,640 feet)
- Built: 1869
- Telescope style: Refractor
- Diameter: 62.5 cm (24.6 in)
- Mounting: German equatorial mount
- Location within Greece

The Newall Telescope is a 62.5 centimetres (24.6 in) refractor in the Penteli Observatory in Penteli, Greece. It was built in 1869 by Thomas Cooke for Robert Stirling Newall and when completed it was the largest refracting telescope in the world. It was located at Newall's private observatory until 1891, when it was moved to the Cambridge Observatory where it stayed until its donation to the National Observatory of Athens and its move to the Penteli Observatory in 1959. The telescope is still operational, though it is only used for educational purposes.

== History ==
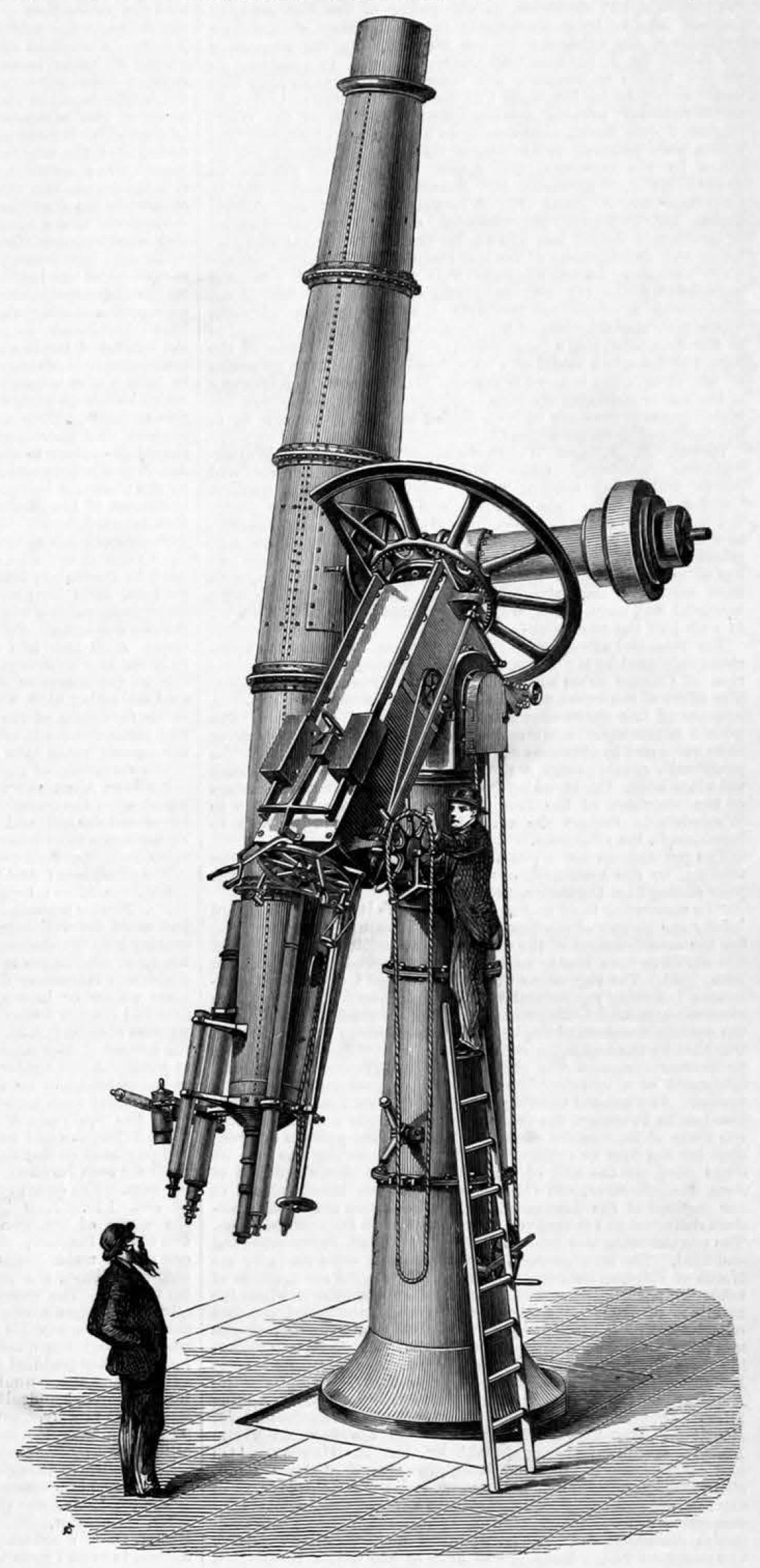
1870 sketch of the Newall Telescope

=== Construction ===
In 1862, Scottish engineer and amateur astronomer Robert Stirling Newall found out about two large crystals made of crown and flint glass that were produced by Chance of Birmingham. He bought them for 500 pounds each and entrusted Thomas Cooke for the construction of the world's largest telescope using these crystals. Newall knew about Cooke thanks to his friend and fellow amateur astronomer Hugh Lee Pattinson, who had bought a 18 centimetres (7.1 in) refractor from Cooke in 1851. Before starting the construction, Cooke had told Newall that the telescope would be completed in less than 12 months but it was actually completed 6 years later in 1869, two years after Cooke's death.

=== In Newall's private observatory ===
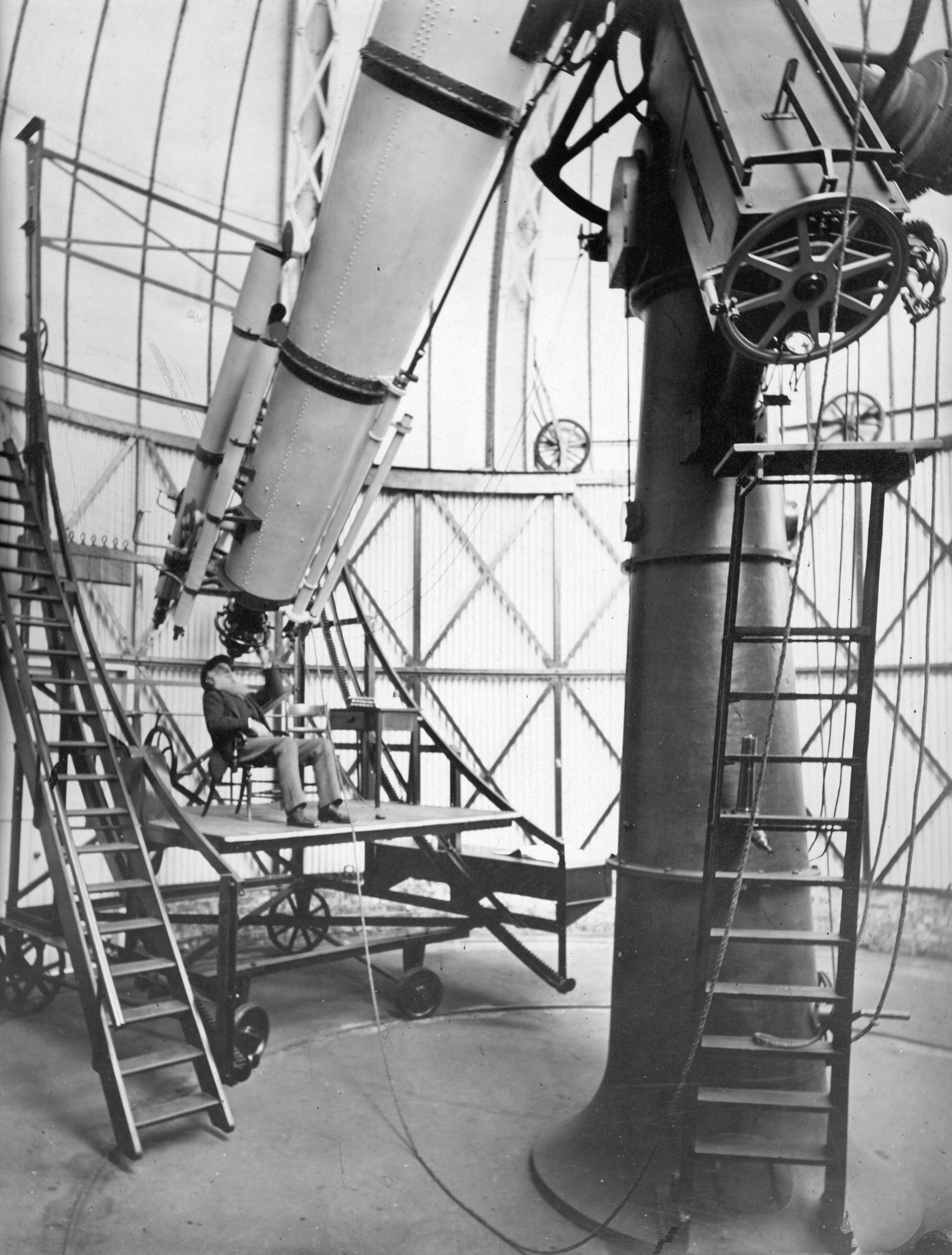
The telescope in Newall's private observatory

The telescope was installed in Newall's private observatory at Ferndene, his residence in Gateshead. It wouldn't remain the largest in the world for long, because just 2 years later Alvan Clark built the US Naval 26 inch telescope for the United States Naval Observatory. Strangely both this telescope and Newall's were located in really unsuitable locations for a big telescope. The Newall Telescope was facing severe light pollution problems and the weather in Gateshead rarely consisted of clear skies. This resulted in Newall not making any significant observations with his telescope, with the only noteworthy one being some very detailed drawings of comet C/1874 H1 (Coggia) in 1874. He did not like watching the telescope being wasted, so he offered to give it to Sir David Gill in the Cape Observatory, who refused because the cost of moving such a large telescope from England to South Africa was extremely high.

=== In the Cambridge Observatory ===
In 1889, the year of his death, Newall offered the telescope to the University of Cambridge, where his son Hugh Frank Newall was senior demonstrator at the Cavendish Laboratory. In 1891 the telescope was finally relocated from Gateshead to a better location at the Cambridge Observatory, with Hugh Newall covering the cost. He also offered to operate the telescope for free for five years, provided that the university would give him a piece of land near the observatory to build his residence. From 1891 until 1911 Hugh Newall made various spectroscopic observations, as well as photometric ones, with the most significant being the discovery that the star Capella is a multiple star system.

Hugh Newall's work was continued by Frederick John Marrian Stratton after 1911 and the telescope's significance as a scientific instrument was widely recognized until the 1930s. By that time, it had become outdated when compared with the newer and sophisticated telescopes that had been created. In the next two decades the telescope was used more and more scarcely. Its dome had also become defective by the 1950s, due to its prolonged usage. These problems led the management of the Cambridge Observatory to decide that the telescope should be donated to another observatory.

=== In the Penteli Observatory ===
The Newall Telescope at Penteli Observatory

The National Observatory of Athens showed interest in the telescope in 1955 and scientists of the Greek institute visited the Cambridge Observatory to examine the telescope and concluded that it was usable. A deal was made in 1957, which was heavily influenced by the long collaboration of Stavros Plakidis with Sir Arthur Eddington in the study of long-period variable stars.

The Newall Telescope would be the largest telescope of the National Observatory of Athens and it was decided that it should be located in a less light polluted area than its central premises in Thiseio. The selected location was the Penteli Observatory, situated on a hill in Penteli from where Stavros Plakidis had been making observations since 1936. The construction of a dedicated building started in 1957 and the telescope was moved there in 1959.

Astronomer Nicolas Matsopoulos presents the Newall telescope at Penteli Observatory

Newall Telescope at Penteli Observatory during a public event

In 1980 it stopped being used for scientific observations due to extreme light pollution in the area. Since the establishment of the Visitor Centre at the Penteli Observatory in 1995 by Nicolas Matsopoulos, it has been used exclusively for educational purposes. The telescope is currently operated by an independent institute of the National Observatory of Athens, the Institute for Astronomy, Astrophysics, Space Applications and Remote Sensing.

== Design ==
The Newall Telescope is 9 metres (30 ft) long and weighs a total of 16,000 kilograms (35,000 lb). Its lenses are 62.5 centimetres (24.6 in) in diameter and are made of crown and flint glass. It is equipped with three finder scopes, two of which have a diameter of 10 centimetres (3.9 in) and the third one has a diameter of 15 centimetres (5.9 in). The telescope's mount is a German equatorial type. It is equipped with various scientific instruments, including an astrographic camera, a spectrometer, a polarimeter and an illuminometer.

The Penteli Observatory is located in the Koufos hill at an altitude of 500 metres (1,600 ft) in Penteli, about 18 kilometres (11 mi) from central Athens. The building housing the telescope was built with pentelic marble and its dome has a length of 14 metres (46 ft). The ground floor's height is adjustable, being able to move vertically for approximately 5 metres (16 ft).

Newall Telescope at Penteli Observatory during a public event

Newall Telescope at Penteli Observatory

Astronomer Nicolas Matsopoulos presents the Newall telescope at Penteli Observatory

The Newall Telescope at Ferndene, Gateshead in 1872

The Newall Telescope at Ferndene, Gateshead in 1872 - The owner R.S Newall operates the telescope

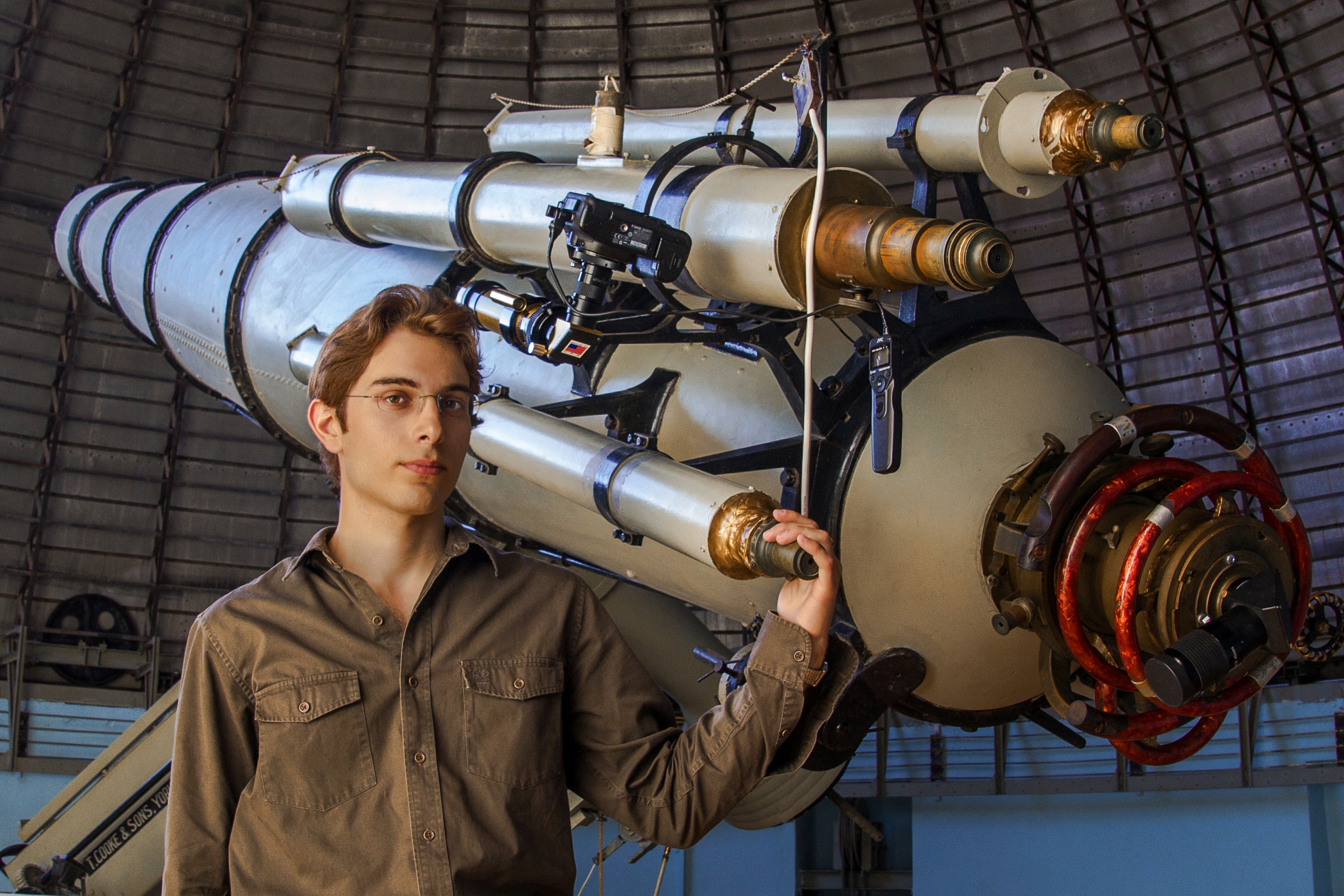
Theofanis Matsopoulos in Athens Observatory

The Newall Telescope dome at Ferndene, Gateshead in 1872

The Newall Telescope at Ferndene, Gateshead in 1872
