= Institute for Space Applications and Remote Sensing =

Former research institute in Greece

Institute for Space Applications and Remote Sensing (ISARS) (Greek: Ινστιτούτο Διαστημικών Εφαρμογών και Τηλεπισκόπησης)
- Established: 1955
- Research type: Basic
- Field of research: Space weather; Solar physics; Plasma physics
- Location: Athens, Greece
- Campus: Mount Penteli
- Affiliations: National Observatory of Athens; National and Kapodistrian University of Athens; European Space Agency
- Website: http://www.space.noa.gr

The Institute for Space Applications and Remote Sensing (ISARS/NOA) (Greek: Ινστιτούτο Διαστημικών Εφαρμογών και Τηλεπισκόπησης) was a research institute in Greece with expertise in multidisciplinary space and environmental sciences. It was an independent research Institute of the National Observatory of Athens (NOA) until 2012 when it was merged with the Institute of Astronomy and Astrophysics to a single unit entitled Institute for Astronomy, Astrophysics, Space Applications and Remote Sensing (IAASARS). Member scientists of all its research groups have broad knowledge of Space Science and Earth observation techniques and their applications. They collaborate with other research groups in Europe and United States, and have been internationally recognized through editorship in scientific journals, invited talks at international conferences, invited review papers in top journals, high rate of citations and coordination of EU-funded research projects.

== History ==
ISARS was founded in 1955, under the name Ionospheric Institute. In 1990, the institute was renamed to Institute of Ionospheric and Space Research and in 1999 took its current title in order to reflect its expanded activities, which cover a variety of aspects of space research and applications. The location of the Institute until July 1995 was the historic site of the Hill of Nymphs near the Acropolis of Athens and the Theseion. The significant increase of staff members and R&D projects made it necessary for the institute to move to new modern facilities at the NOA campus north of Athens, on Mount Penteli. In 2012 it was merged with the Institute of Astronomy and Astrophysics to a single unit entitled Institute for Astronomy, Astrophysics, Space Applications and Remote Sensing (IAASARS), which is supervised and supported by the General Secretariat of Research and Technology of the Greek Ministry of Education.

== Facilities ==
=== Hellenic GeoMagnetic Array ===
The National Observatory of Athens operates ENIGMA (Hellenic GeoMagnetic Array), a ground-based magnetometer array in the area of south-eastern Europe (central and southern Greece) for space weather applications. The four existing stations are latitudinally equi-spaced between 30° and 33° corrected geomagnetic latitude and cover the areas of Thessaly, Central Greece and the Peloponnese. Each station is equipped with a state-of-the-art vector fluxgate magnetometer. In the near future another station will be installed in Macedonia or Thrace, and there are plans for the installation of an additional station in Crete by mid-2010. One of the primary research objectives assigned to ENIGMA is the study of geomagnetic field line resonances (FLRs).

=== Ionospheric Station ===
A fully automated ionospheric station operates at Penteli site since September 2000. Users can access real-time ionograms with the results of the automatic scaling, preview some recent ionograms and download daily SAO files using the SAO Data Base. For more information visit the Ionospheric Station Page.

=== Satellite Receiving Stations ===
==== NOAA/AVHRR Image Acquisition Station ====
The National Observatory of Athens operates an AVHRR image acquisition station manufactured by Telonics Inc. The receiving antenna is installed at ISARS ('Lofos Koufou'). Satellite data from NOAA 12, 14, 15 and 16 are acquired on a daily basis. Images are archived (since 1998), pre-processed (radiometric calibration, navigation, enhancement) and value added products are produced according to user requirements.

==== SEAWIFS Image Acquisition Station ====
ISARS has become in 2002 an authorized SeaWiFS data user and an authorized direct readout ground station. HRPT data are captured on a daily basis with frequency of 1 image per day. Archived data can be provided to users on demand.

==== METEOSAT Receiving Station ====
The Meteosat receiving station installed at ISARS is a Dartcom PDUS system. Data in the visible and near-infrared as well as water vapour data from the Geo-stationary satellite Meteosat are captured on a daily basis with a frequency of 2 images per hour. The images are stored for several days but are not archived on a regular basis.

== See also ==
- List of government space agencies
