= Elias Mariolopoulos =

Greek Meteorologist and professor academic

Elias G. Mariolopoulos
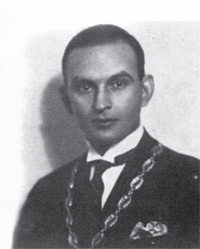

Rector of the University of Athens
- In office 1959–1960

Director of the National Observatory of Athens
- In office 1935–1936
- Preceded by: Nikolaos Kritikos
- Succeeded by: Georgios Chors

Personal details
- Born: 1900 Athens, Greece
- Died: February 13, 1991 (aged 90–91) Athens, Greece
- Profession: Professor; Dean; Climatologist
- Known for: Father of Modern Climatology and Meteorology (Greece)
- Scientific career
- Education: University of Athens; University of Cambridge; Imperial College London; University of Paris
- Awards: Order of the Phoenix; Order of George I
- Fields: Climatology; Meteorology
- Workplaces: Aristotle University; University of Athens; NOA; Academy of Athens
- Academic advisors: Demetrios Eginitis

Elias Mariolopoulos (Greek: Ηλίας Γ. Μαριολόπουλος; 1900 – February 13, 1991) was a Greek astronomer, physicist, author, professor, dean, meteorologist, and climatologist. He is considered the father of modern Greek meteorology and climatology. Elias established a facility for the measurement of atmospheric electricity for the first time in Greece and also founded a special radiometric station in Hymettos, as an extension to the National Observatory of Athens. As an academic, he was the doctoral advisor overseeing the publication of dozens of doctoral dissertations. He was the dean of the School of Physics and Mathematics at both the Aristotle University of Thessaloniki and National and Kapodistrian University of Athens twice. Elias was also the rector of the latter university.

Elias was born in Athens. He studied at the University of Athens, University of Cambridge, Imperial College London, and the University of Paris. He worked with world-renowned meteorologist Napier Shaw. He returned to Greece where he spent most of his life working in academic settings. He was affiliated with the University of Athens, Aristotle University, the Academy of Athens, and the National Observatory of Athens. He wrote hundreds of academic papers in the field of meteorology and climatology.

Elias was a member of countless international organizations dealing with meteorology and climatology namely the Royal Meteorological Society of England and the Union Of Greek Physicists. He was the first academic in Greece to raise awareness about the smog pollution problem and its ramifications for the atmosphere. He helped found the Research Centre for Atmospheric and Climatological Physics at the Academy of Athens. He won countless awards for his contribution to the field some include the Commander of the Royal Order of Georgios I and Supreme Commander of the Royal Order of the Phoenix. He died in Athens in 1991. The Mariolopoulos Kanaginis Foundation for the Environmental Sciences and the Mariolopoulos Trust Fund Award were named after him.

== History ==
Elias was born in Athens. His father's name was Giorgios and the family originated from the village of Magouliana in the Arcadia region of Greece. Elias attended the University of Athens School of Physics and Mathematics. He continued his studies on scholarship at the University of Cambridge completing a master's degree; in addition, he received a Degree in Meteorology from the Meteorological School of the Imperial College of Science and Technology in London and worked with Napier Shaw. Elias continued his studies at the University of Paris while he was working as a meteorologist in France and England. He obtained a doctorate degree in 1925 from the University of Paris. Later that year he returned to Greece and was appointed head of the Meteorological Department of the National Observatory of Athens.

Three years later in 1928, Elias was elected chair of the Meteorology and Climatology Department of the School of Physics and Mathematics at the Aristotle University of Thessaloniki. In 1931, he was elected vice president of the International Climatology Board a position he held until the outbreak of World War II. He briefly became the director of the National Observatory of Athens for one year from 1935 to 1936. Around this period, he married Ekaterini Nina Kanaginis. By 1939, he became the director of the Meteorological Institute of the National Observatory of Athens. When World War II broke out he was a reserve lieutenant and in command of a team of meteorologists for the Hellenic Air Force. After the war, Mariolopoulos continued to work at the National Observatory of Athens establishing a method for the measurement of atmospheric electricity and building a radiometric station in Hymettos for the Observatory.

He was a member of the International Committee of Upper Atmosphere and the International Committee of Agricultural Meteorology. Throughout his life, Elias was the dean of the School of Physics and Mathematics at both the Aristotle University of Thessaloniki and the University of Athens twice and rector of the University of Athens from 1959 to 1960. The Academy of Athens elected him as a member in 1965. In 1966, the French Academy of Sciences honored him with an award. He became president of the Academy of Athens in 1973. He wrote over one hundred articles that were published internationally and domestically. Elias was a pioneer in raising awareness about the deterioration of the atmosphere due to smog in the mid-1960s. He gathered measurements of certain atmospheric pollutants from the Meteorological Institute of the National Observatory of Athens.

In 1977, at around 77 years old he founded the foundation of the Research Centre for Atmospheric and Climatological Physics at the Academy of Athens in collaboration with C. Zerefos. For his incredible achievements, the Royal Meteorological Society of England elected him a partner member. He was also an honorary member of the Serbian Meteorological Society and the Hungarian Meteorological Society. He also served Chairman of the State Geodetic and Geophysical Committee and National Radioelectronics Committee. The vice-chairman of the Supreme Telecommunications Council and honorary president of the Greek Meteorological Society. He was president of the Union Of Greek Physicists and a member of the European Goudenhome Kalergi Foundation in Switzerland. He was the president of Othon and Athina Stathatou Award and the president of the Empeirikeian Foundation. Finally, he was president of the Pan-Arcadian Federation of Greece and honorary president of the Tegea Association.

He was the recipient of many awards namely the Supreme Commander of the Order of the Holy Sepulcher in 1930, the Commander of the Royal Order of the Phoenix in 1936, The French Medal Officier de l’ Academie in 1938, the Golden Cross of the Phoenix with Swords in 1946, the Medal of Campaign 1940/41 in 1948, the St. Mark's War Medal in 1948, Commander of the Royal Order of Georgios I in 1953, Supreme Commander of the Royal Order of the Phoenix in 1959, the French Medal Officier de la Legion d’ Honneur in 1960, and the Egyptian Medal of Supreme Commander of the Order of Arabic Value in 1960. After his death, his wife established the Mariolopoulos Kanaginis Foundation for the Environmental Sciences. The foundation established the Professor Mariolopoulos Trust Fund Award a biennial award for research work in 1996.

== Literary works ==
Books and Articles authored by Elias G. Mariolopoulos
| Date | Title | Title in English |
|---|---|---|
| 1925 | Etude sur la Stabilité du Climat de la Grèce Depuis les Temps Historiques | Study on the Stability of the Climate of Greece Since Historical Times |
| 1932 | Étude des Régimes Pluviométriques de la Grèce | Study of Rainfall Regimes of Greece |
| 1934 | Aperçu sur le Climat de la Grèce | Overview of the Climate of Greece |
| 1937 | Observations de L'eclipse Totale de Soleil, du 19 juin 1936 Observations de la Mission Scientifique de l'Observatorie National d'Athens | Observations of the Total Solar Eclipse, June 19, 1936 Observations of the Scientific Mission of the National Observatory of Athens |
| 1955 | Αι βροχοπτώσεις εν Ελλάδι | Rainfall in Greece |
| 1967 | Transparence de l'Atmosphère Martienne et Visibilité des Détails de la Surface dans le Bleu et Ultra-Violet | Transparency of the Martian Atmosphere and Visibility of Surface Details in Blue and Ultra-Violet |

Books and Articles authored by Elias G. Mariolopoulos
| Date | Title |
|---|---|
| 1923 | On the Formation of Local Depressions in the Mediterranean |
| 1962 | Fluctuation of Rainfall in Attica During the Years of the Erection of the Parthenon |
| 2012 | Compendium in Astronomy |

== Bibliography ==
- Zerefos, Christos (2017). "Elias Mariolopoulos' Curriculum Vitae". Athens, Greece: Mariolopoulos-Kanaginis Foundation. Archived from the original on 21 January 2022.
- Gardikas, Katerina (2018). Landscapes of Disease Malaria in Modern Greece. New York, NY: Central European University Press. ISBN 9786155211980.
- Bender, Thomas A. (1960). Selected Bibliography on the Climate of Greece. Washington D.C.: Sponsored by the Air Weather Service Climatic Center U. S. Air Force.
- Mariolopoulos, Elias G.; Mavrides, Lysimachos N.; Theocaris, Pericles S. (2012). Compendium in Astronomy. Dordrecht Holland: Dordrecht Reidel Publishing. ISBN 9789400977662.
