= Hugh Ernest Butler =

Welsh astronomer

Hugh Butler FRSE MRIA FRAS
- Hugh Butler ca. 1967
- Born: Hugh Ernest Butler; 27 December 1916; Llandaff, Wales
- Died: 10 May 1978 (aged 61); West Linton, Scotland
- Education: Emmanuel College, Cambridge
- Awards: Isaac Newton Studentship
- Scientific career
- Fields: Astronomy
- Workplaces: University of Cambridge; Dunsink Observatory, County Dublin; Royal Observatory, Edinburgh
- Thesis: Infra-Red Stellar Spectroscopy (1948)
- Academic advisors: Dr. A.D.Thackeray; Prof. H.A.Brück

Hugh Ernest Butler FRSE MRIA FRAS (27 December 1916 – 10 May 1978) was a pioneering Welsh-born astronomer. Wartime work included important contributions to anti-aircraft gunnery followed in peacetime by major contributions to galactic and extragalactic research particularly via ballistic rockets. He promoted the idea of an orbiting space telescope as early as 1958.

== Life ==
He was born on 27 December 1916 in Llandaff in Glamorganshire in Wales.

He was educated firstly at Cardiff High School and then at Whitgift School in Croydon before being awarded a place at Emmanuel College, Cambridge, winning a scholarship to read Mathematics.

In 1940 he received an Isaac Newton Studentship and commenced work on a PhD but the telescope on which he was working was dismantled as a result of the war and the academic work had to be put on hold. In the same year he was asked to join Prof Patrick Blackett to do operational research in anti-aircraft guns in Richmond, in relation to defending the country during the Second World War. He spent much of the war at various anti-aircraft installations around the country and while not engaged in work he was spending what time he could seeing one Gwendoline Harrison, a scholarship student who he had met at Cambridge when she was evacuated from London.

In 1946 he returned to Cambridge to be based at the Cambridge Observatory as Senior Observer and was able to complete the observational work on his PhD In 1947 he transferred to Dunsink Observatory, part of the Dublin Institute for Advanced Studies in Ireland, where he stayed until 1953.

At Dunsink he produced a number of papers concerning the photoelectric recording of stellar occultations and stellar scintillation , topics that led ultimately to the technologies that support the discovery of exoplanets and the construction of large ground-based optical telescopes respectively. He was also intensely practical and gained a significant reputation for the design and implementation of novel instruments. At Dunsink these skills were put to good effect in building it up as a modern observatory. He also took part in the commissioning of the Armagh-Dunsink-Harvard (ADH) Schmidt telescope at Bloemfontein, South Africa which produced much valuable early material for galactic and extragalactic research.

In 1953 he moved to Edinburgh Observatory where he continued for the rest of his life in the role of senior astronomer.

There he set up a large Hewitt-Schmidt Camera as an outpost observatory near Peebles. The 'Hewitt' was specifically designed for the observation and tracking of satellites and in October 1957 he and Dr. Vincent Reddish were jointly two of the first astronomers in the UK to observe the track of the Sputnik 1 satellite .

At Edinburgh Dr. Butler turned his attention to the embryonic field of space research and as Head of the new Space Division he oversaw and contributed to the design and launch of a number of observational payloads mounted on ballistic rockets . Central to these were the Skylark launchers which were launched from Sardinia or from the Woomera Instrumented Range . He authored numerous articles for the press and was called upon to comment in print or on television on topics such as comets, satellites, eclipses and astronomy in general . He was for instance the expert of choice when a large and fresh crater was discovered in Stornoway (he concluded that it was not, as had been suggested a meteorite).

As early as 1958 Dr Butler was promoting the idea of a large astronomical satellite (LAS) as part of his work with the British National Committee for Space Research (BNCSR) and he had a leading role in explaining the research that could be conducted from such a platform both to the scientific community and to the public at large . He followed this up in 1963 by chairing a group that prepared a specification for the European Space Research Organisation's first LAS. By the 1970s Dr. Butler was fully involved in European space research collaboration and in 1972 he edited a report on aspects of the ESRO Stabilised Satellite TD 1 .

He was elected a Fellow of the Royal Society of Edinburgh in 1959 and served as its Vice-President from 1967–69 and Curator from 1969 until his death.

He retired from the observatory in 1976 and moved to rural Peeblesshire though he retained access to the observatory's facilities.

His interests were wide-ranging and in his personal life he was fascinated by atmospheric phenomena and everything to do with wildlife and the natural world. He and Gwen were keen tennis and badminton players and Hugh applied his practical skills to a number of significant DIY construction projects. He was colourblind and presented a BBC radio programme on the subject in 1964.

He died at home in Peeblesshire suddenly on 10 May 1978.

== Family ==
He married Gwen in 1943 and due to attitudes at the time, she was forced to choose between marriage and a teaching career and so in getting married she had to give up the career. They were a devoted couple until Hugh Butler's death in 1978 and there was never the slightest suggestion that she regretted this choice. She never remarried and died in 2016 aged 97. Throughout those 38 years she spoke of him often. They had one son, John, born in 1953.
