= Hugh Newall =

British astrophysicist (1857–1944)

Hugh Frank Newall
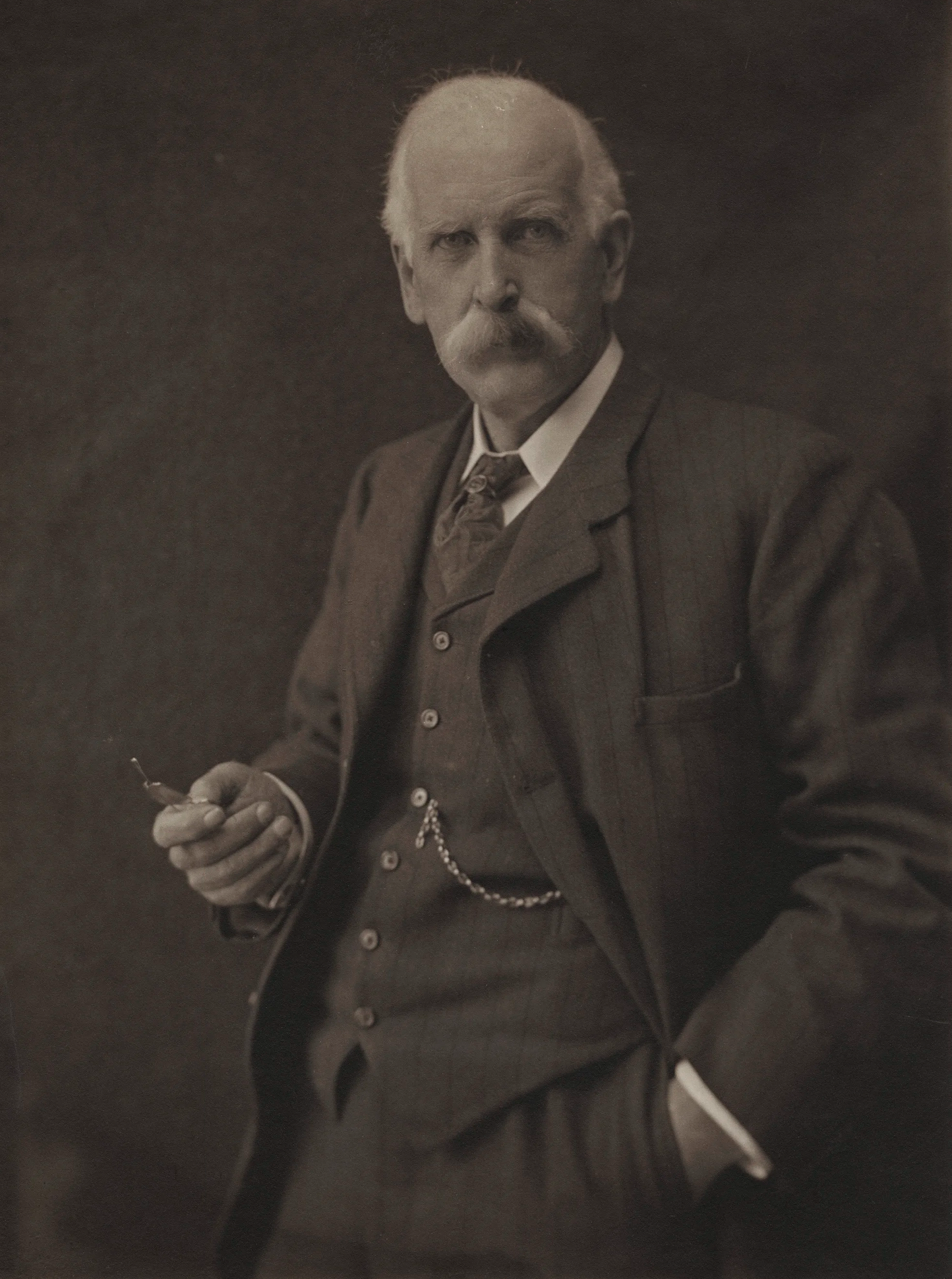
- Portrait by Olive Edis, 1925
- Born: 21 June 1857
- Died: 22 February 1944 (aged 86)
- Education: University of Cambridge
- Scientific career
- Fields: Astrophysics
- Institutions: Cavendish Laboratory

Hugh Frank Newall (21 June 1857 – 22 February 1944) was a British astrophysicist. He was Professor of Astrophysics (1909) at Cambridge. He was the son of Robert Stirling Newall FRS and his wife Mary, daughter of Hugh Lee Pattinson, FRS.

Newall took the Mathematics and Natural Sciences Tripos from Trinity College, Cambridge, and was elected Fellow in 1909. His father was an astronomer, and the Newall Telescope, a 25-inch refractor, built at Gateshead, was in its time the largest in existence. As things turned out, the telescope would dominate the son's life. Newall took up school mastering at Wellington after graduating. He returned to Cambridge when J.J. Thomson, the Nobel prizewinning physicist, asked him to be his assistant. After a period as demonstrator in experimental physics at the Cavendish Laboratory he turned to astronomy. This came about because in 1889 the university was offered Newall senior's telescope, but claimed to lack the funds to receive it and use it. Newall (junior) thereupon paid the removal expenses and then served as observer, and, from 1909 to 1928, as first holder of the chair of astrophysics, without a stipend. The telescope was installed beside the 1810 telescope at the Observatory on Madingley Road, and Newall built a home at Madingley Rise which became for half a century a resort of visiting astronomers.

He served as president of the Royal Astronomical Society for a customary two-year term, 1907–1909.

Newall at the Fourth Conference International Union for Cooperation in Solar Research at Mount Wilson Observatory, 1910

In 1913 he became the first director of the Solar Physics Observatory. Though elected a Fellow of the Royal Society (FRS) in June 1902 for work on the spectrum of Capella, Newall was more a facilitator than a creative scientist. He led many eclipse expeditions. He married twice, first to Margaret (a pianist) the granddaughter of Thomas Arnold, the famed headmaster of Rugby School, and second, Dame Bertha Surtees Phillpotts, Scandinavian Scholar, formerly Mistress of Girton College, and the only woman member of the Royal Commission on Cambridge (1923-7), who is buried in Tunbridge Wells.

He is buried in the Parish of the Ascension Burial Ground in Cambridge.
