= Wilder Observatory =

Observatory in Massachusetts, US

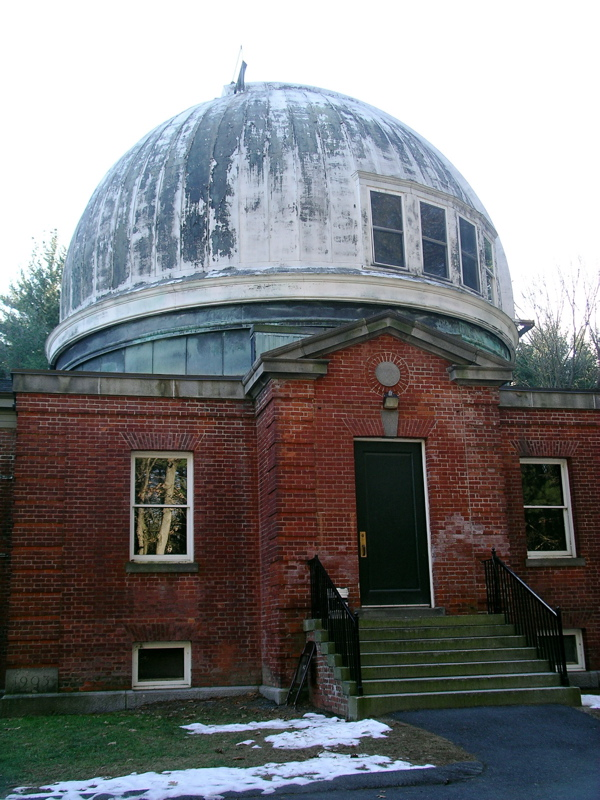
- Wilder Observatory in 2003
- Organization: Amherst College
- Location: Amherst, Massachusetts, United States
- Coordinates: 42°21′56.7″N 72°31′27″W
- Established: 1903

Telescopes
- Unnamed Telescope: 18" Alvan Clark and Sons refractor
- Related media on Commons

Wilder Observatory is an astronomical observatory owned by Amherst College. It is located on Snell Street in Amherst, Massachusetts, United States, and was designed by the architectural firm of McKim, Mead & White. It was renovated in 2001, along with the telescope. The Amherst Area Amateur Astronomers Association offers observing nights at the Observatory.

== Telescope ==
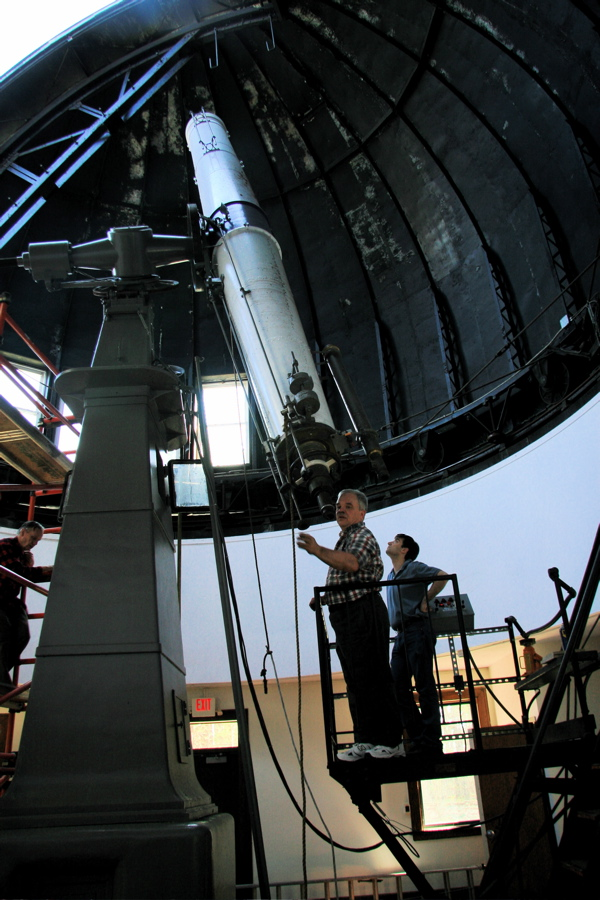
The 18-inch refractor at Wilder Observatory

When the Wilder Observatory was built in 1903, the telescope was one of the largest telescopes in the world at 18 inches (0.46 m), and it remains one of the largest refractors. Built by Alvan Clark & Sons, the instrument was shipped to Chile in the summer of 1907 to observe the planet Mars. This was due to Mars being at opposition, which occurs approximately every twenty-six months. Because the Mars opposition of 1907 placed the planet low over the southern horizon from North America, it was deemed advantageous to ship a large instrument to a point below the equator, where Mars would appear directly overhead due to the more southerly latitude. Because of the extremely dry climate of the Atacama Desert, the telescope remained set up for the three-week period encompassing the opposition window in the open, without a shelter such as the dome under which it was normally housed. Following the opposition, which allowing for some then state-of-the-art pictures of the red planet to be taken, the telescope was then returned to its observatory.

The objective glass blank was made by Feil-Mantois and was figured over 18 months by Carl Lundin of Alvan Clark & Sons. The dome was built by W.N. Kratzer Structural Steel of Pittsburgh, Pennsylvania. The pier and German equatorial mount was constructed by Warner and Swasey of Cleveland, Ohio. The total cost of the telescope in 1903 was $12,000, and of that the objective itself was $5,000.

== Amherst Area Amateur Astronomers Association ==
The Amherst Area Amateur Astronomers Association offers observing nights at Wilder Observatory. .

== See also ==
- List of astronomical observatories
