= Thomas Cooke (scientific instrument maker) =

British instrument maker

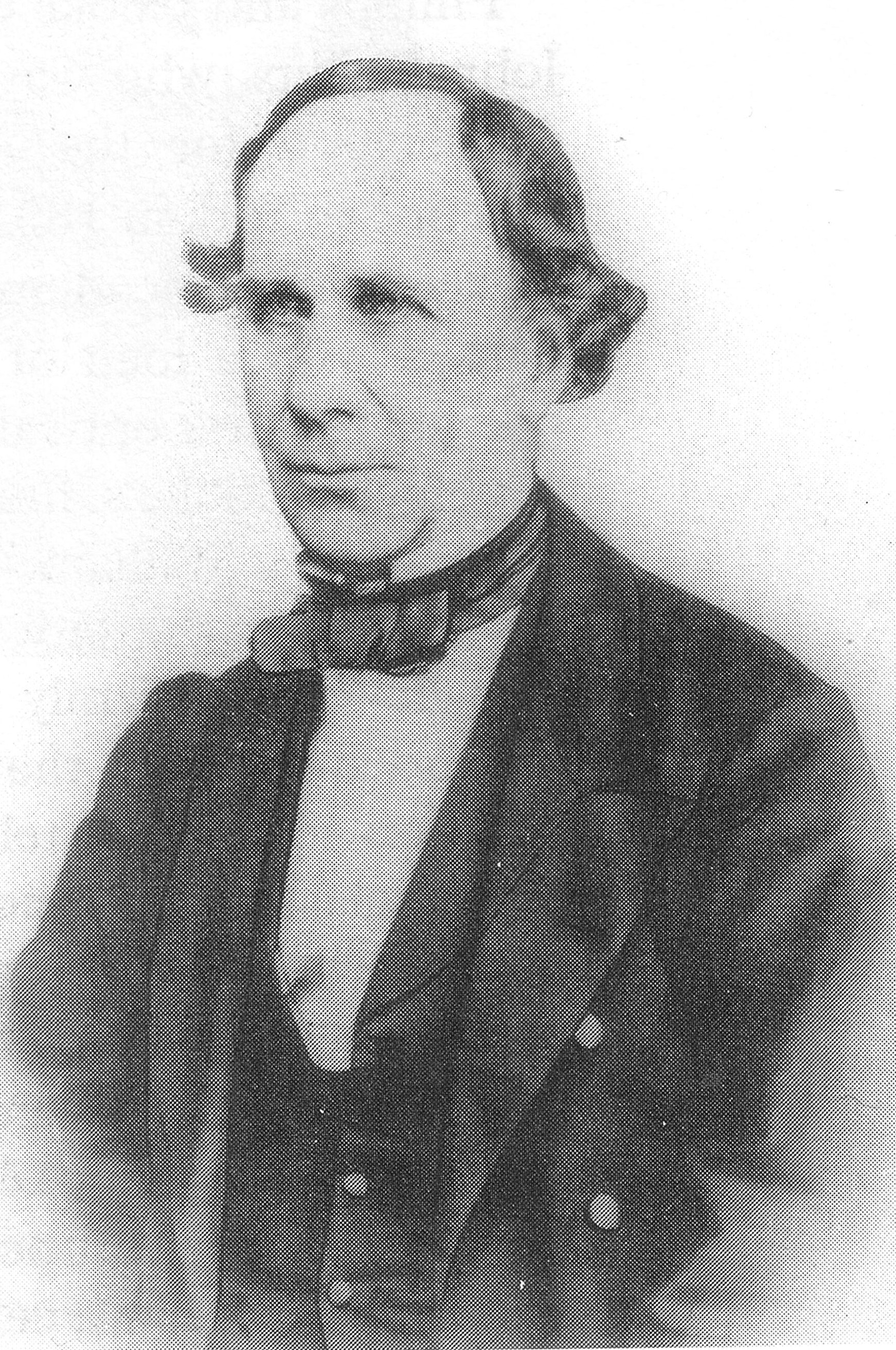
Thomas Cooke

Thomas Cooke (8 March 1807 – 19 October 1868) was a British scientific instrument maker based in York. He founded T. Cooke & Sons, the scientific instrument company.

== Life ==
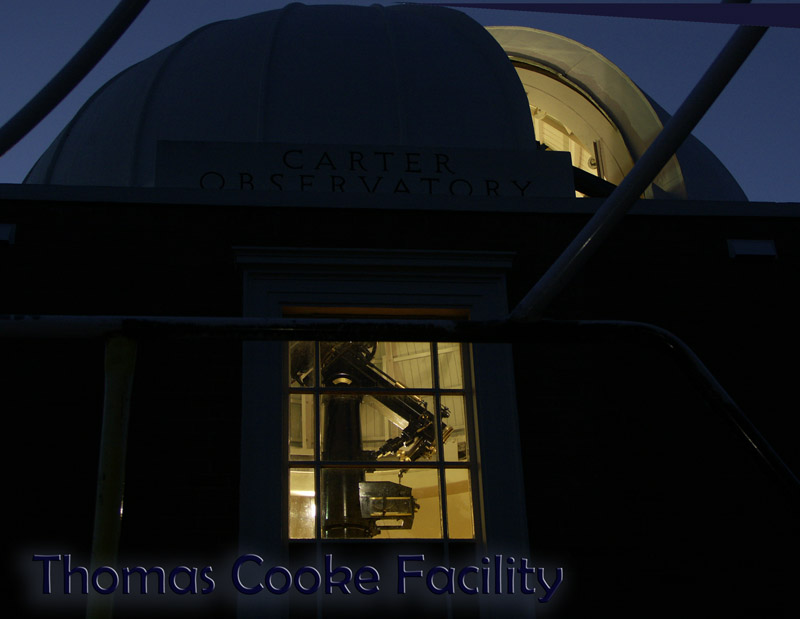
Thomas Cooke telescope at Carter Observatory, in Wellington, New Zealand

Thomas Cooke was born in Allerthorpe, near Pocklington, East Riding of Yorkshire, the son of James Cook (a shoemaker).

Cooke attended Pocklington Grammar School for about two years before becoming apprenticed to his father, a shoemaker. He continued learning after this and he taught himself navigation and astronomy with the intention of becoming a sailor. His mother dissuaded him from that career and he became a teacher. He made such a success of being an impromptu teacher to the farmers’ sons of the Pocklington district, that only a year later he was able to open a village school at Bielby. He continued to teach others by day and learn himself by night, and soon moved his school from Bielby to Skirpenbeck.

At Skirpenbeck he met his future wife, who was one of his pupils, and five years his junior. Fifty years on she spoke of how her husband developed his brief rudimentary education into becoming a schoolmaster: “He first learned mathematics by buying an old volume from a bookstall with a spare shilling. He also got odd sheets, and read books about geometry and mathematics, before he could buy them; for he had very little to spare”.

But Cooke's interest in mathematics and science was practical as well academic. He had also retained his interest in navigation and instruments, and while at Skirpenbeck he made his own first rudimentary telescope – grinding a lens by hand out of the bottom of a glass whisky tumbler, then mounting in into a frame that he soldered together from a piece of tin. In 1829 he moved to York and worked as a mathematics schoolmaster at the Rev. Schackley's School in Ogleforth, near York Minster. He also taught in various ladies' schools to increase his income.

His marriage to Hannah was to produce seven children, five of whom were boys. Two of these Charles Frederick (1836–98) and Thomas (1839–1919) subsequently joined him in the business he founded in 1836 at number 50 (now renumbered to 18) Stonegate, close to York Minster with the assistance of a loan of £100 from his wife's uncle.

Cooke studied optics and became interested in making telescopes, the first of which was a refracting telescope with the base of a tumbler shaped to form its lens. This led to his friends including John Phillips encouraging him to make telescopes and other optical devices commercially.

== Work ==
In 1837 he established his first optical business in a small shop at 50 Stonegate, York, and later moved to larger premises in Coney Street. He built his first telescope for William Gray. At that time, the excise tax on glass discouraged the making of refracting telescopes, which were usually imported from abroad. Cooke was thus one of the pioneers of making such telescopes in Britain.

He made more instruments and built his reputation. He was not only an optician but had mechanical abilities as well, and among other things, manufactured turret clocks for church towers. He founded the firm T. Cooke & Sons. In 1855 he moved to bigger premises, the Buckingham Works at Bishophill in York, where factory methods of production were first applied to optical instruments. He exhibited at the York Exhibition in 1866 demonstrating his three-wheeled, steam-powered car which he claimed could carry 15 people at 15 mph for a distance of 40 miles.

One of his finest achievements was the construction of the 25-inch 'Newall' refractor for Robert Stirling Newall; sadly, Thomas died before seeing it completed. For some years the Newall was the largest refracting telescope in the world. On Newall's death it was donated to the Cambridge Observatory and finally moved in 1959 to Mount Penteli observatory in Penteli, Greece. He made a telescope for the Royal Observatory, also Greenwich and another for Prince Albert. The firm amalgamated with Troughton & Simms (London) to become Cooke, Troughton & Simms in 1922 and this later became part of Vickers, but still run by his sons Thomas & Frederick.

Thomas Cooke was succeeded by his sons, Thomas and Frederick. He is buried in York Cemetery.

== Telescopes in use today ==
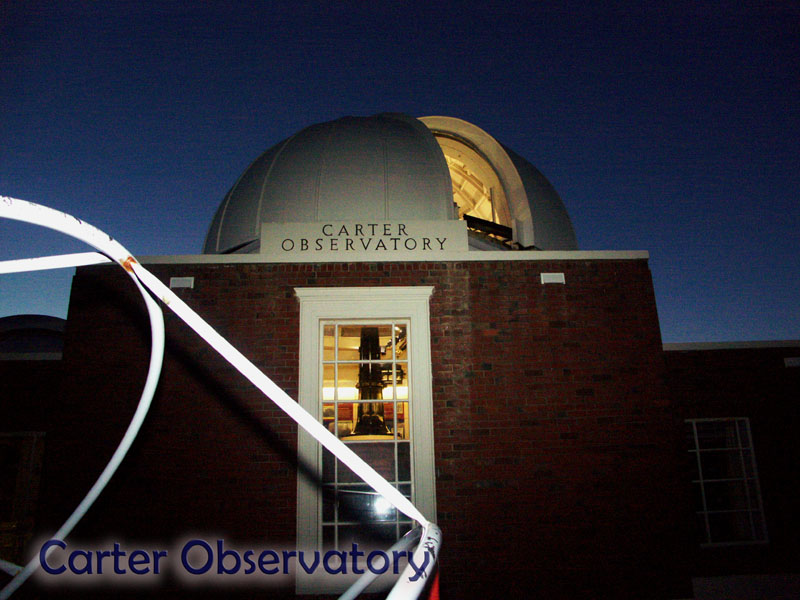
Thomas Cooke telescope at Carter Observatory, in Wellington, New Zealand

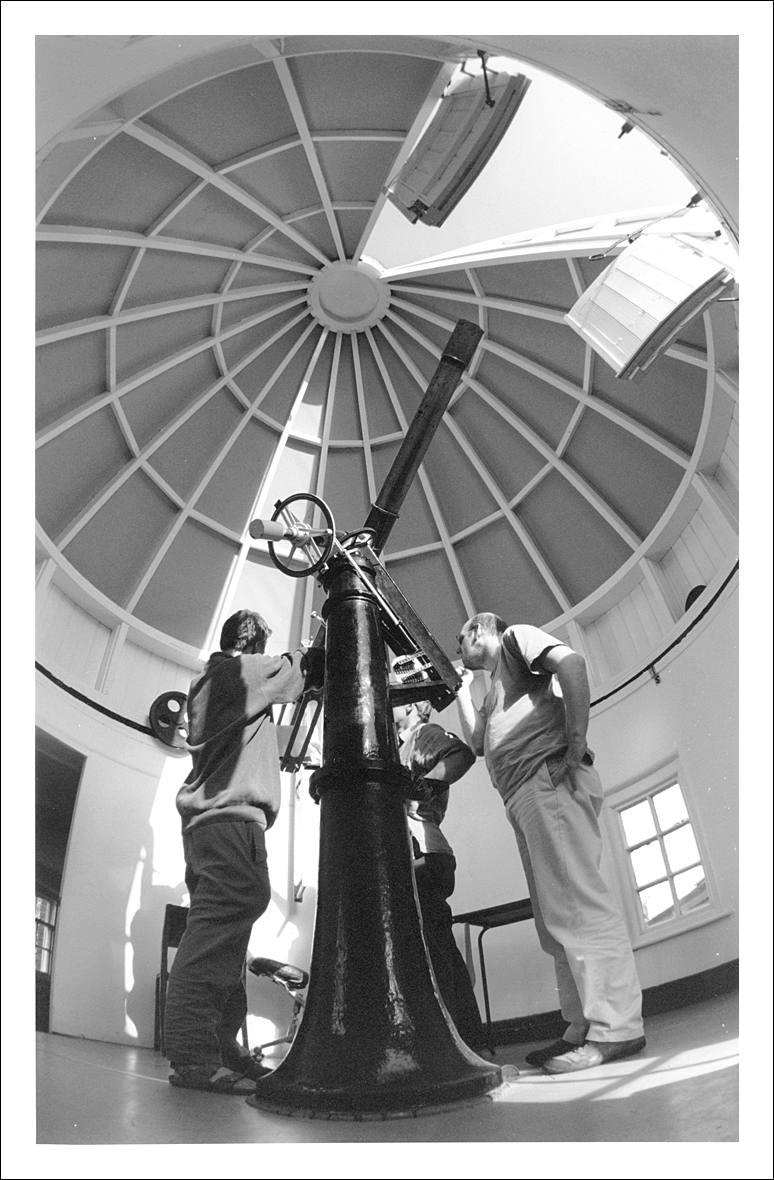
Thomas Cooke refractor in Bootham School Observatory

- A telescope made by Thomas Cooke is still in daily use at Carter Observatory – The National Observatory of New Zealand, delivering excellent results. The original 9-inch triplet lens has been replaced by a 9 1/2 doublet made by renowned optician Garry Nankivell.
- At the observatory in the Museum Gardens, York there is a working 4-inch telescope, built for the Yorkshire Philosophical Society in 1850. A second unit of the same construction was purchased and installed in the observatory at Bootham School, York in 1854. A third matching instrument, dating from the same period, was donated to Friendsʼ School, Hobart in 1974 by the grandson of Jonathan Backhouse Hodgkin. All three instruments remain in active service.
- A 5" refractor dating from 1883 is still in use at Coats Observatory, Paisley, Scotland.
- A 5" refractor dating from 1880 is still in regular use at Clanfield Observatory, Hampshire.
- There is a 6" Cooke telescope in the Airdrie Public Observatory, Airdrie, North Lanarkshire, Scotland run by the Airdrie Astronomical Association.
- A 6” Cooke refractor is the main telescope in use at the Hampstead Observatory in London. Known as the ’Wildey telescope’ (in tribute to renowned master optician, Henry Wildey), the telescope can be used by the public on the observatory's open nights (most Friday and Saturdays).
- There is a 6" Cooke telescope in use at the Baxendell Observatory in Hesketh Park, Southport
- A 6" Cooke refractor exists in the 1929 observatory of the University of Saskatchewan, Saskatoon, Saskatchewan, Canada,
- A 6.25" refractor known as the 'Lockyer Telescope' is in use at the Norman Lockyer Observatory in Sidmouth, Devon, UK. The lens, made by Cooke, was first used in 1865 in a telescope built by Norman Lockyer. Cooke later rebuilt the telescope in its present form in 1871. The telescope was positioned in several locations before being moved to Sidmouth in 1912, where it remains. Lockyer used this telescope to discover helium in the solar corona. It was restored in 1995 and is now used mainly for public-outreach.
- A 6.5" refractor manufactured in 1870 is in use at the Assheton Observatory at Rossall School.
- A 6.5" refractor manufactured in 1876 is in use at the Astronomic Observatory of the Odessa National University in Odessa, Ukraine.
- An 8" refractor dating from 1864, known as the Thorrowgood Telescope belongs to the Royal Astronomical Society and is operated at the Cambridge Observatory.
- An 8" refractor is housed in the Jeremiah Horrocks Observatory, Moor Park, Preston, Lancashire.
- The Fry telescope, an 8" refractor manufactured in 1862, is in regular use at the University of London Observatory in Mill Hill, London.
- A 10" refractor from 1860 is in use at the Blackett Observatory, Wiltshire.
- A 10" refractor from 1871, which was purchased by St. Andrews in 1938 and used as a training telescope, has been in use since 1951 at Mills Observatory, Dundee, Scotland.
- A 15,5" refractor (F/15 focal length) made by Thomas Cooke is part of the historical collection of the INAF-Astronomical Observatory of Abruzzo. Manufactured in England in 1885, the Cooke telescope was purchased by Director Vincenzo Cerulli and transported to the then Collurania Observatory around 1890. This telescope is still equipped with the original optomechanical components. It is currently used during evening visits open to the public for observations of Solar System objects and bright targets in the Messier catalogue (globular clusters, nebulae, and so on). The instrument was perfectly successful from an optical point of view due to the clarity of its objective and the remarkable resolving power. The Cooke telescope is housed inside the dome of the main pavilion of the Observatory: the hemispherical dome was built by the Cooke House of York in 1885, with a diameter of 31 ft, manual movements, iron frame and paper-machè cover (pressed cardboard). The telescope and the dome were purchased second-hand by Cerulli, having already been used in Scarborough (North Yorkshire) by the first owner, the astronomer James Wigglesworth.
- A 18" refractor was acquired by National Observatory (Brazil) in 1911 but only setup on 1922 due to World War I. It is the largest refractor in Brazil and it is used for outreach nowadays.
- A 25" refractor from 1869 "Newall Telescope" is in use at the National Observatory of Athens, Penteli, Greece

== See also ==
- List of astronomical instrument makers
- Optical telescope
