= Robert Stirling Newall =

Scottish engineer and astronomer

- R. S. Newall
- Born: 27 May 1812; Dundee, Scotland
- Died: 21 April 1889 (aged 76); Gateshead, England
- Known for: Submarine telegraph cable

Robert Stirling Newall FRS FRAS (27 May 1812 – 21 April 1889) was a Scottish engineer and astronomer.

== Life and work ==
He was born in Dundee on 27 May 1812. He began his career in a local merchant's office before he moved to London, where he worked for Robert McCalmont on experiments on the generation of steam. He later spent two years in America promoting McCalmont's business interests.

In 1838, while L. D. B. Gordon was studying at the Freiberg School of Mines, in Germany, he visited the mines at Clausthal and met Wilhelm Albert. Impressed by what he saw, he wrote to Robert urging him to invent a machine for making wire ropes. After receiving Gordon's letter, Newall designed a wire-rope machine consisting of four strands and four wires per strand. When Gordon returned to the UK in 1839, he formed a partnership with Robert and Charles Liddell, registering R. S. Newall and Company in Dundee. On 17 August 1840, Newall patented "certain improvements in wire rope and the machinery for making such rope."

R. S. Newall and Company established a factory in Gateshead, England, and began producing wire ropes for mining, railway, ships' rigging, and other purposes. From that point onward, Newall played a key role in improving submarine telegraph cables, developing a method that used gutta percha insulation surrounded by strong wires. The first successful cable was laid between Dover and Calais on 25 September. In 1851, he left his previous post and continued manufacturing on a large scale. In 1853, he invented the 'brake-drum' and cone for laying cables in deep seas. Owing to the scarcity of engineers competent to deal with the special difficulties of the work, Newall himself directed the submergence of many of his cables. Among these were the lines from Holyhead to Howth, Dover to Ostend, Malta to Corfu, besides several others in the Mediterranean, Suez to Aden, Aden to Kurrachee, Constantinople and Varna to Balaclava in 1855. Half of the first Atlantic cable was manufactured at his works. The last submarine line laid by him personally was that connecting Ringkjobing in Denmark with Newbiggen, Northumberland, in 1868.

Newall was a keen astronomer, and he commissioned Thomas Cooke to build a telescope for his private observatory at Ferndene, his Gateshead residence, which came to be known as the Newall Telescope. For many years, the 25 inch refracting telescope was the largest in the world, and it was given to the Cambridge Observatory after his death in 1889. By the end of the 1950s, the telescope had fallen into disuse, and in 1958 it was donated to the National Observatory of Athens and it was placed at the Penteli Astronomical Station, just north of the city of Athens.

He was elected a fellow of the Royal Astronomical Society in 1864, of the Royal Society in 1875, and became a member of the Institute of Mechanical Engineers in 1879, and received an honorary degree from the University of Durham in 1887. He received the Order of the Rose of Brazil in 1872. Newall died at his home, Ferndene, on 21 April 1889.

== Marriage and Issue ==
Newall married, on 14 February 1849, Mary Pattinson, who was the youngest daughter of Hugh Lee Pattinson FRS, with whom he had four sons and one daughter. Their most distinguished son was Hugh Newall FRS.

Their eldest son Arthur Newall married fabric embroiderer Josephine ('Zeffie') Moody (1853 - 1923) (who was the eldest child of Major-General Richard Clement Moody, the founder of British Columbia) at St James's Church, Piccadilly, on 20 July 1883. Their eldest son Robert Stanley FSA (1884 - 1987) of Little Cottage Street, Westminster, was an ethnographer of Aboriginal Australia and an archaeologist for the Commissioners of Woods and Forests who made excavations at Stonehenge with Lieutenant-Colonel William Hawley between 1919 and 1926, and was Vice President of Salisbury Museum from 1971. Their second son was named Basil (b. 1885).
