= Ionospheric sounding =

Radio technique

In telecommunications and radio science, an ionospheric sounding is a technique that provides real-time data on high-frequency ionospheric-dependent radio propagation, using a basic system consisting of a synchronized transmitter and receiver.

The time delay between transmission and reception is translated into effective ionospheric layer altitude. Vertical incident sounding uses a collocated transmitter and receiver and involves directing a range of frequencies vertically to the ionosphere and measuring the values of the reflected returned signals to determine the effective ionosphere layer altitude. This technique is also used to determine the critical frequency. Oblique sounders use a transmitter at one end of a given propagation path, and a synchronized receiver, usually with an oscilloscope-type display (ionogram), at the other end. The transmitter emits a stepped- or swept-frequency signal which is displayed or measured at the receiver. The measurement converts time delay to effective altitude of the ionospheric layer. The ionogram display shows the effective altitude of the ionospheric layer as a function of frequency.

== See also ==
- Kennelly–Heaviside layer
- Edward V. Appleton
