= Cambridge Observatory =

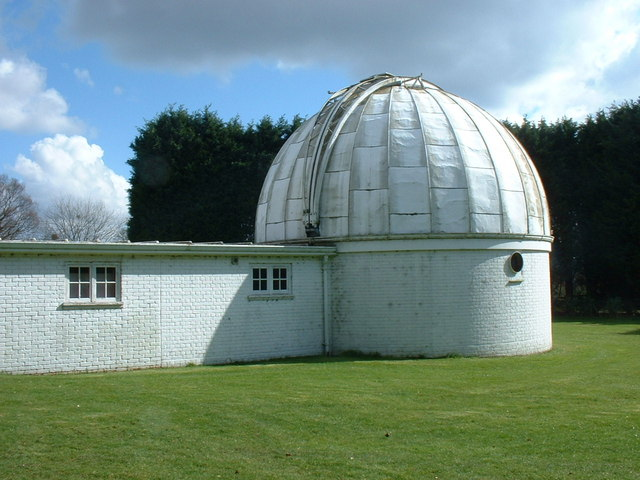
- This dome contains a 36 inch diameter reflector telescope
- Organization: University of Cambridge
- Observatory code: 503
- Location: Cambridge, Cambridgeshire, East of England, England
- Coordinates: 52°12′49″N 0°05′40″E
- Related media on Commons

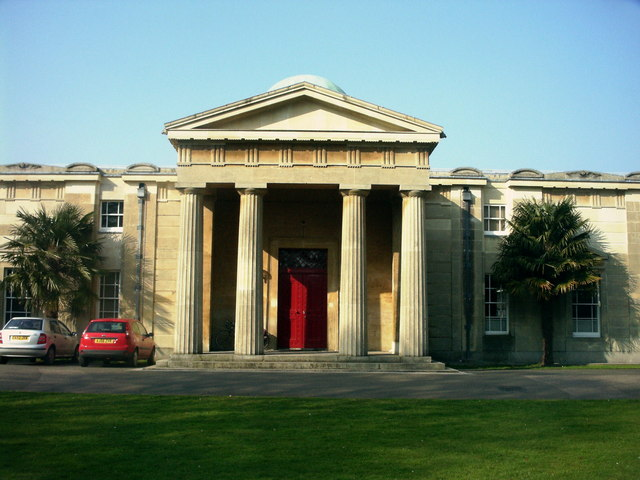
This doric portico is the main entrance to the Cambridge Observatory building

Cambridge Observatory is an astronomical observatory at the University of Cambridge in the East of England. It was established in 1823 and is now part of the site of the Institute of Astronomy. The old Observatory building houses the Institute of Astronomy Library which has a collection of modern and historical astronomical books.

There are a set of optical telescopes at the site on the Madingley Road in the west of Cambridge. By modern standards these are small, as well as being affected by light pollution. The 36-inch telescope was used for studies of stellar radial velocities until 2019, and the historic Northumberland and Thorrowgood telescopes are used as part of the public outreach activities of the Institute.

From 1990 to 1998, the Royal Greenwich Observatory was based in Cambridge in Greenwich House, just to the north of the Observatory.

== Notable Senior Observers ==
- John Couch Adams
- Hugh Ernest Butler
- Arthur Eddington
- Hugh Newall
- Robert Woodhouse

== See also ==
- List of largest optical telescopes in the British Isles
- Listed buildings in Cambridge (west)
