= Focas =

Focas may refer to:

- Focas (lunar crater), a crater on the Moon
- Focas (Martian crater), a crater on Mars
- Jean Focas (1909–1969), Greek-French astronomer
- Spiros Focás (born 1937), Greek actor

== See also ==
- Phocas
- Foca (disambiguation)
- Fokas (disambiguation)
