= Félix Chemla Lamèch =

Greek-French astronomer

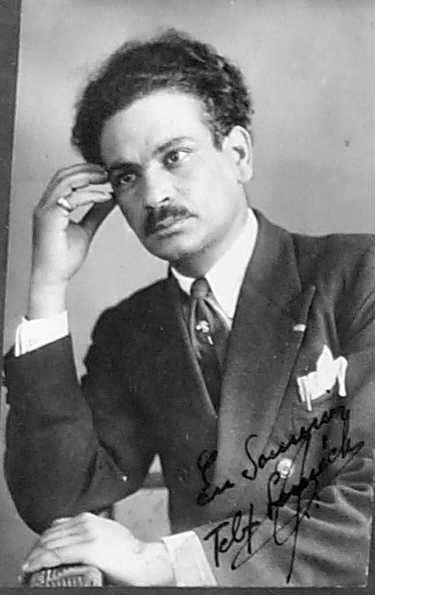
- Born: 11 January 1894; Ariana, French Tunisia
- Died: 14 May 1962 (aged 68); Paris, France
- Known for: Lamèch (crater)
- Scientific career
- Fields: Astronomy; Celestial Cartographer
- Workplaces: Corfu Observatory; Toulouse Observatory
- Notable students: Jean Focas

Félix Chemla Lamèch (11 January 1894 – 14 May 1962) was a Greek-French astronomer, meteorologist, selenographer, and celestial cartographer. In 1924, he founded the Corfu Observatory. He also founded the first Astronomical Society of Greece on the island of Corfu. He was also one of the founders of the publication Ουρανία (Urania) and his articles were also published in L'Astronomie. He collaborated with countless Greek astronomers namely Theodore Stephanides whom he proposed to name a crater on the Moon after. He also gave Jean Focas his early astronomical education. Félix published a detailed map of the Moon in 1955. The crater Lamèch on the Moon is named after him.

Félix was born in Ariana (Tunis) and traveled to Greece in the 1920s where he built the Corfu Observatory to study the Moon, Saturn, and other astronomical phenomena. His first publication was about Saturn in 1926 in collaboration with Greek polymath Theodore Stephanides. He continued to live in Greece until 1929. He moved to France to the Toulouse Meteorological Service at the Garonne Observatory. He frequently returned to Greece but permanently lived in France. On 31 July 1934 he published his first map of the Moon honoring his colleagues from Corfu, Greece. When World War II broke out he joined the French Army. After the war, the Corfu Observatory was decommissioned because it was bombed and the Astronomical Society of Greece ceased operations. Félix continued his work and published a detailed map of the Moon in 1955. He died in Paris in 1962. A street in Corfu was named after him.

== Biography ==
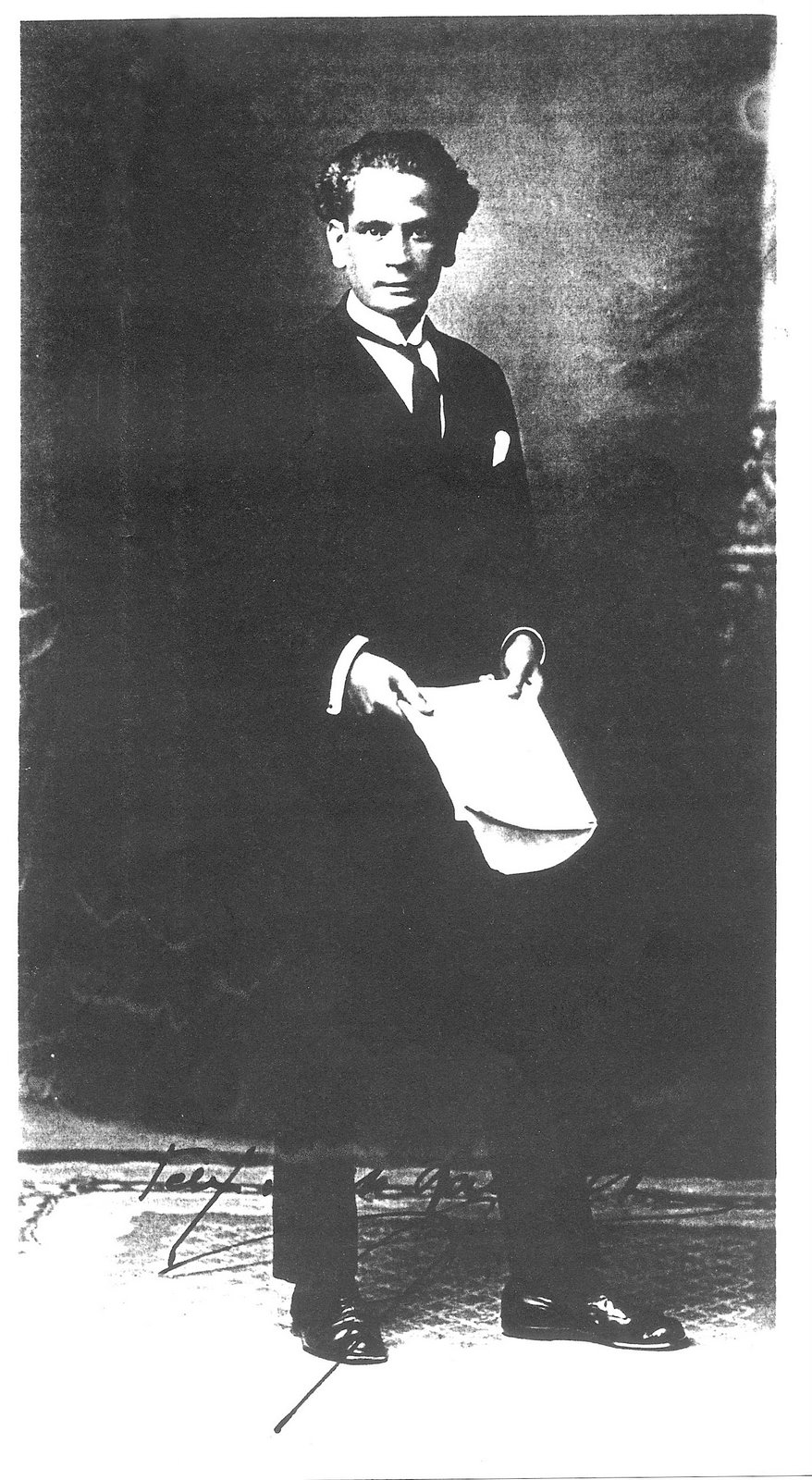
Felix Chemla Lamech

Félix was born in Ariana and served France during World War I. He continued his studies in Paris, collaborating with Maurice Darney and Gabriel Delmotte, and traveled to Greece in 1923. He spent a large portion of his life in Greece. He erected the Corfu Observatory in 1924 and was the observatory's first director. In 1926, he began building a map of the moon based on drawings he made with the telescope. Félix worked with notable polymath Theodore Stephanides, and on 4 May 1926 they published an article together about Saturn. Félix drew the planet and its rings. That same year Félix founded the Greek Astronomical Society of Greece which was authorized by the President of the Hellenic Republic Theodoros Pangalos who visited the observatory along with Archbishop Athinagoras. Director of the Athens Observatory, Demetrios Eginitis, was named honorary president, while the Metropolitan of Corfu, Athenagoras, became an honorary member.

On 9 July 1927 Félix gave a lecture About Comets, Their Laws, and Their Origin at the summer theater called Phoenix. The theme dealt with the origin of the universe. By September 1927, Félix was criticized by the engineer and theologian P. Kokkolis in the newspaper Corkyraiki Elpis regarding the origin of the universe. He accused Félix of calling Moses a liar. On 4 March 1928 the Greek Astronomical Society of Corfu began publishing Ουρανία (Urania) a journal associated with the astronomical society. In July 1928, the local ecclesiastical community attacked Félix once again in the publication Agios Spyridon directed by Archimandrite Parthenios Pollakis. The cause of the attack were the popular astronomy lectures and articles published by Félix about the creation of the universe based on scientific evidence. Félix's activity was defended by a portion of the local press. By early 1929, Félix left Corfu taking with him critical astronomical instruments which almost led to the dissolution of the observatory. Félix returned with the equipment and continued his partnership with the observatory. Around the same period, Félix became the head of the Toulouse Meteorological Service at the Garonne Observatory but frequently returned to Corfu.

While he was in France he completed a new map of the Moon with a 135-millimeter telescope. The map was published in France on 31 July 1934. Félix named five lunar craters after notable people he knew from Corfu: Kefallinos 4119, Moumouris 896, Stephanidis 302, Vali Kogevina 4692, Voutinas 4019 and his own name. The names were never accepted by the International Astronomical Union but a street in Corfu was named after Félix and Spyros Voutsina (Spiroi Voitsina).

Because of the declaration of war, Félix enlisted as a volunteer in the French army, and after the invasion of France, he followed the French army to Africa. He survived the war. His complete map of the Moon was published in 1955. In the library of the observatory of Toulouse, there is a handwritten study by him entitled Etudes Monographiques (no. 5408) and dated 12 September 1956, attached to it is a series of diagrams of the lunar formations with the marking that they were made mainly in Corfu. He resumed his scientific activity and spent the last years of his life in a deserted villa in the Paris suburb of Aulney-sous-Bois. Later in life he suffered from heart disease and had no contact with anyone. He died in 1962.

== Corfu Observatory ==
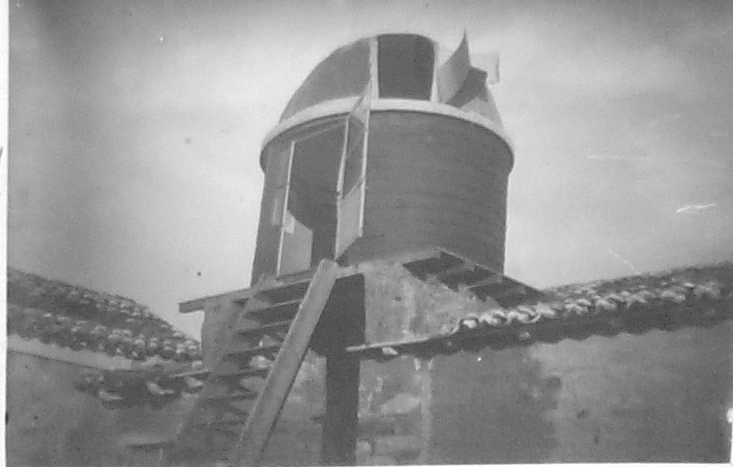
Corfu Observatory

The Corfu Observatory was founded on 24 May 1924. The observatory was located on the Hill of Kogevina. Félix brought the first telescope. He designed and built a rotating dome on the site. The observatory was built with funding from the owner of the hill. The equipment included a 110 mm meridional dioptric telescope housed with a 2.5 m diameter dome, a 160 mm equatorial dioptric telescope with all its accessories, housed in a 4.5 m diameter dome. The Astronomical Society bought the land and house from Ioannis Kogevina to build the second dome in 1933. The facility was also equipped with a meteorological camera. The spectroscope was donated by Theodore Stephanides in the summer of 1930. The observatory also featured two small diopter telescopes, one was 61 mm and the other 81 mm, they were primarily used for educational purposes because the observatory was often frequented by Corfu students under the supervision of mathematician Spyros Voutsina. The observatory was the first facility used by Jean Focas and also assisted Félix and other extraordinary astronomers in their journey to further understand the universe. Regrettably, it was bombed in the early 1940s and rendered useless. The remaining remnants were removed in April 1989. Afterward, a group of historians began to build historical information about the site. The street Felix Lamech in Corfu, Greece, passes the Hill of Kogevina where the observatory once stood.

== Astronomical Society of Greece ==
On 4 December 1926 Félix introduced the idea of a Greek Astronomical Society; it was created on 13 February 1927 by unanimous vote. It was the first Astronomical Society of Greece and it was based in Corfu. The Greek Astronomical Society of Greece was authorized by the President of the Hellenic Republic Theodoros Pangalos. The rules of the Astronomical Society of Greece (AETE) were voted in the hall of the 2nd Gymnasium by a 5-member temporary committee. On April 10, the first Board of Directors was unanimously elected, while the Director of the Athens Observatory, Demetrios Eginitis, was named honorary president. Jean Focas became the general secretary at 18 years old.

The Astronomical Society of Greece created a periodic journal entitled Ουρανία (Urania). The publication featured a total of fifty-four (54) issues. The structure of the publication followed the style of the French publication L'Astronomie. Ουρανία (Urania) was printed primarily in (Greek, French) but sometimes there were articles in English and German. Félix resigned from the board of directors on 25 March 1929. The same year the society added an astronomical school in Corfu. The next year Stavros Plakidis proposed changes to the society and in 1936 offered to move the headquarters to Athens but the members declined the offer. The Astronomical Society of Greece ceased to exist after World War II but another society of the same name was founded in the 1990s and the Astronomical Society of Corfu came into existence around the same period replacing the original one started in Corfu.

== Literary works ==
Books and Articles authored by Félix Chemla Lamèch
Date	Title	Title in English
1926	L'Observatoire de Corfou Fondation d'une Société Astronomique Grecque.	The Observatory of Corfu Foundation of a Greek Astronomical Society
1926	Observations: Saturne en 1926	Observations of Saturn in 1926
1957	Les Intumescences de puiseux et des aires elliptiques de Delmotte	The Intumescences of Puiseux and the Elliptical Areas of Delmotte

== Sources ==
- Zoumbos, Giorgos (20 February 2017). "Το Αστεροσκοπείο της Κέρκυρας (1924-1940)" [The Corfu Observatory (1924-1940)] (in Greek). Corfu, Greece: Corfu History. Archived from the original on 28 November 2022.
- Evershed, Mrs. John (1937). "Memoirs of the British Astronomical Association" (PDF). British Astronomical Association. 32–34: 55. Bibcode:1943MmBAA..34E..55..
- Nikolaou, Paschalis (2020). Encounters in Greek and Irish Literature Creativity, Translations and Critical Perspectives. Cambridge, UK: Cambridge Scholars Publisher. ISBN 9781527548718.
- Jahrgang, Sechster (1926). "Sterne" [The Stars]. Published by Robert Henseling with the Support of the Astrophysical Observatory at Potsdam (in German).
