= Demetrios Eginitis =

Greek Astronomer and professor academic

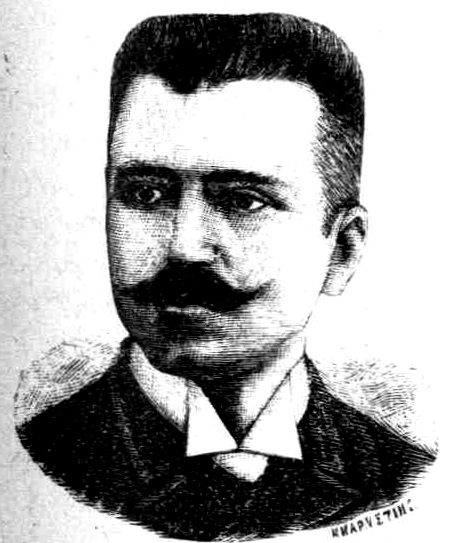

Dean of the School of Philosophy (University of Athens)
- In office 1901–1902
- Preceded by: Pavlos Karolidis
- Succeeded by: Margaritis Evangelidis

Director of the National Observatory of Athens
- In office 1890–1934
- Preceded by: Demetrios Kokkidis
- Succeeded by: Stavros Plakidis

Personal details
- Born: July 10, 1862 Athens, Greece
- Died: March 14, 1934 (aged 71) Athens, Greece
- Resting place: First Cemetery of Athens
- Profession: Professor, Dean
- Known for: Academy of Athens; University of Thessaloniki; Gregorian Calendar Greece; Eastern European Time Zone; Stability of the Solar System
- Scientific career
- Education: University of Athens; Sorbonne
- Awards: Legion of Honour
- Fields: Astrophysics; Meteorology; Seismology
- Workplaces: University of Athens; Observatory of Athens; Academy of Athens; Evelpidon; Paris Observatory
- Notable students: Jean Focas

Demetrios Eginitis or Aiginitis (Greek: Δημήτριος Αιγινήτης; July 10, 1862 – March 14, 1934) was a Greek astronomer, physicist, mathematician, author, professor, dean, and politician. He replaced Demetrios Kokkidis becoming the fifth director of the National Observatory of Athens and the longest-serving director in the Observatory's history. He was one of the few Greek astronomers in modern Greek history during the 1800s, others included Georgios Konstantinos Vouris and Johann Friedrich Julius Schmidt. He served as Minister of Education twice.

Eginitis was born in Athens, he attended the prestigious Varvakeio School of Athens and later attended the University of Athens studying Mathematics from 1879 to 1886. He received a scholarship to study astronomy and mathematics at the Sorbonne from 1886 to 1890. While in France he wrote his world-renowned paper Sur la Stabilité du Système Solaire (On the Stability of the Solar System) and also published over one thousand astronomical observations. He returned to Greece and revived the Athens Observatory breaking it into three divisions Astronomy, Meteorology, and Geodynamics. He became a professor at the University of Athens a position he held from 1896 to 1934. He introduced the Eastern European Time Zone in Greece and the Gregorian calendar replacing the Julian calendar as the country's standard. He founded the Academy of Athens and organized the University of Thessaloniki.

He was a member of the IAU Committee on Meridian Observations. Eginitis was also a member of the German Astronomical Society (Astronomische Gesellschaft), the Royal Astronomical Society in London, the French Astronomical Society (Société Astronomique de France), the Portuguese Institute of Coibra and the International Meteorological Committee (Comité Météorologique International). Eginitis received countless honors and awards throughout his life including the French medal Legion of Honour.

== Early life ==
He was born in Athens, Greece. His father's name was George. Demetri's brother was also a astrophysicist named Vasileios Aiginitis. Demetrios married Anthi Efthymiou and the couple had one daughter named Aigli. Demetrios graduated from the famous Varvakeio School of Athens in 1879. By the age of 17, he attended the University of Athens and remained at the institution from 1879 to 1886. He studied mathematics with some of Greece's most brilliant minds of the time namely John Hazzidakis, Cyparissos Stephanos, Vassilios Lakon, and Nikolaos Nikolaidis. Because of his outstanding performance as a student, the Athens University Council for post-doctoral studies awarded him a scholarship to study astronomy and mathematics at the Sorbonne from 1886 to 1890. He left Greece at 24 years of age.

Initially, he was accepted as an apprentice astronomer (élève astronome) at the meteorological observatory of Parc Montsouris. He was also affiliated with the Paris Observatory. For two years Demetrios traveled around France and England working at different astronomical facilities namely the meteorological centre of Parc Saint Maur, the Meudon Observatory, the Observatory of Nice and Lockyer’s astronomical laboratory in England. By 1889 he was awarded a staff astronomer at the Paris Observatory. He also did extensive research on Stellar Spectra with Georges Salet and Alfred Cornu.

Eginitis carried out equatorial observations following the meridian circle using the meridian telescope located in the western dome of the Paris Observatory. He also observed asteroids and variable stars with the telescope. While he was at the Paris Observatory Eginitis also studied the secular variations of the semi-major axes of planetary orbits under the supervision of Ernest Mouchez. He submitted his work to the Paris Academy in 1889 and Ernest Mouchez presented it. The work was entitled Sur la Stabilité du Système Solaire (On the Stability of the Solar System). Eginitis became internationally known for his work.

== Return to Athens ==
The Athens Observatory was funded by Simon Sinas. Johann Friedrich Julius Schmidt, his research and equipment were all financed by the fund. When Schmidt and Sinas died the Observatory was no longer funded. Greek astronomer Demetrios Kokkidis managed the Observatory with no salary for a short period making minor advancements in the field of astronomy. Kokkidis was extremely busy teaching at three different institutions. The Greek government decided to ask Eginitis to take over the dilapidated structure and in 1890 they passed a special law under the government of Charilaos Trikoupis. Eginitis was responsible for updating the equipment and beginning a new era of research for the facility. He was the longest-serving director of the National Observatory of Athens from 1890 to 1934. It is the oldest research institution in Greece. By the year 1895, Eginitis established three departments within the National Observatory of Athens: Astronomy, Meteorology, and Geodynamics.

Eginitis expanded the network of weather stations and created dozens of provincial weather stations. The astronomer also established seismological stations to monitor earthquakes and other geophysical activity. By 1896, he became professor of Meteorology and Astronomy at the University of Athens a position he held until 1934, roughly thirty-eight years. He also taught Astronomy and Geodesy at Evelpidon. He served as dean of the Philosophical School from 1903-1904. He lobbied to separate the scientific departments from the Philosophical School. The School of Physics and Mathematics was established in 1904 and he was the dean of that school from 1908-1909.

A vast European network of railroads connected with Greece and a universal timezone was necessary to communicate with the rest of the world. Eginitis persuaded the Greek Government to adopt the Eastern European Time Zone on July 28, 1916. The standard is still used today. Eginitis served as Minister of Education in 1917, a position he held for about one year, that same year the King of Greece had to resign. Eginitis was highly respected by the Greek royal family. Eginitis and Fokion Negris helped write the resignation speech for Constantine I. Constantine was pressured to resign because of World War I. His wife was Wilhelm II's sister. Constantine's son and Wilhelm II's nephew Alexander assumed the throne for three years until his father assumed the throne once again for another two years.

The Greek church followed the Julian calendar for over one thousand years and it was the acceptable calendar in modern Greece. Regrettably, the rest of the world followed the Gregorian calendar. Eginitis lobbied the church and state to follow the uniform internationally accepted calendar. The calendar was accepted in 1923 but the church still observes festivals including easter following the traditional Julian calendar. Three years later in 1926, he served as Minister of Education for a second time. He helped organize the University of Thessaloniki and was also one of the founders of the Academy of Athens by 1928, he was the vice-president and in 1929, the 4th President of the Academy of Athens. He remained the general secretary of the institution until 1933. The Academy of Athens was one of the astronomer's greatest gifts to the Greek people.

Eginitis had an astonishing career as a scientist. He was a world-renowned astronomer. He wrote countless articles and books in the field of astronomy. He died on March 13, 1934. The municipality of Athens donated a small mausoleum at the First Cemetery of Athens. Eginitis had a state funeral at the church Agios Georgios Karytsis. The oration was given by the Dean of the School of Physics and Mathematics of the University of Athens Chemistry professor Konstantinos D. Zeghelis. The University of Thessaloniki also had a special ceremony for the professor. He was also mourned internationally by various publications.

== Scientific Work ==
=== Sur la Stabilité du Système Solaire ===
The planets orbit around the Sun but they also independently rotate. Astronomers debated the stability of the Solar System. The Solar System was understood to be chaotic, although it seemed to be stable. Observational Astronomers noticed by viewing Jupiter and Saturn via astronomical telescopes that Jupiter's orbit appeared to be shrinking while that of Saturn was expanding. This caused alarm, and an explanation was sought Pierre-Simon Laplace, Joseph-Louis Lagrange, and Siméon Denis Poisson proposed an explanation using complex mathematics. Laplace found a common trend within the Jupiter–Saturn system. Five periods of Jupiter's orbit around the Sun are equal to two periods of Saturn's orbit. Laplace concluded that any two planets and the Sun must be in mutual equilibrium and thereby launched his work on the stability of the Solar System. In 1786, he proved that the eccentricities and inclinations of planetary orbits to each other always remain small, constant, and self-correcting. Eignities built on this research and performed similar calculations for Earth, Jupiter, and Saturn using complex mathematics.

While Eignities was in France he tried to solve difficult astronomical problems. The first problem was the belief our world will be destroyed. Eignities concluded the Earth would approach the Sun for 20,000 years and then the semi-major axis of orbit will start to increase for a specific period and the cycle will continue. Similar to the work of Laplace and his contemporaries. The next important question was if the Earth would approach the Sun leading to the destruction of all life. Eginitis postulated that the variations in the average distance to the Sun were so minuscule that it would not have an effect on Earth. Because of his work, he gained the respect of the international astronomical community, and Camille Flammarion specifically congratulated his efforts. Eginitis published close to one thousand astronomical observations in the Annales de l’Observatoire de Paris and the Comptes Rendus of the French Academy of Sciences while he was in France.

=== Conclusions ===
1. The major axes of planetary orbits are subject to secular inequalities of the third order with respect to the masses of the planets.
2. These inequalities are periodic and of periods excessively long, so that, on account of their smallness, they may be supposed proportional to time for several centuries.
3. The Earth and Saturn, as a result of these inequalities, approach the Sun by exceedingly small quantities.

== Literary works ==
Books and Articles authored by Demetrios Eginitis
Date	Title	Title in English
1889	Sur la Stabilité du Système Solaire	The Stability of the Solar System
1899	Annales De L'Observatoire National D'Athenes Volume 2	Annals of the National Observatory of Athens Volume 2
1900	Radiants Observés à l'Observatoire National d'Athènes	Radiants observed at the National Observatory of Athens
1901	Annales De L'Observatoire National D'Athenes Volume 3	Annals of the National Observatory of Athens Volume 3
1908	Το Κλίμα της Ελλάδος	The Climate of Greece
1909	Πρακτική Μετεωρολογία	Practical Meteorology
1910-1911	Observations De Saturne	Observations of Saturn
1910	Sur la Constitution Physique des Comètes	The Physical Constitution of Comets
1922	Κοσμογραφία προς Χρήσιν των Γυμνασίων	Cosmography for High Schools
1927	Le Passage de Mercure Sur le Disque Solaire du 10 Novembre 1927	The Passage of Mercury on the Solar Disc on November 10, 1927
1928	Le tremblement de terre de Corinthe du 22 Avril 1928	The Corinth Earthquake of April 22, 1928
1930	Le probleme de la Maree de L'Euripe	The Problem of the Euripus Strait

Books and Articles authored by Demetrios Eginitis
Date	Title
1898	On the Apparent increase Insize of the Solar and Lunar Discs when Near the Horizon

== See also ==
- E. M. Antoniadi

== Bibliography ==
- Theodossiou, E.Th.; Manimanis, V.N.; Mantarakis, P. (2007). "Demetrios Eginitis Restorer of the Athens Observatory" (PDF). Journal of Astronomical History and Heritage. 10 (2): 123–132. Bibcode:2007JAHH...10..123T. doi:10.3724/SP.J.1440-2807.2007.02.05. ISSN 1440-2807. S2CID 129260817.
- Stefanidis, Michail K. (1952). Εθνικόν και Καποδιστριακόν Πανεπιστήμιον Αθηνών Εκατονταετηρίς 1837-1937. Τόμος Ε′, Ιστορία της Φυσικομαθηματικής Σχολής [National and Kapodistrian University of Athens Centenary 1837-1937. Volume V, History of the Faculty of Physics and Mathematics] (PDF). Athens: National and Kapodistrian University of Athens.
- Eginitis, D. (1890). Mémoire Sur La Stabilité Du Systéme Solaire [The Stability of the Solar System]. Paris, FR: Observatory of Paris.
- Savaidou, Irini Mergoupi (2010). 'Δημόσιος Λόγος περί Επιστήμης στην Ελλάδα, 1870–1900: Εκλαϊκευτικά Εγχειρήματα στο Πανεπιστήμιο Αθηνών, στους Πολιτιστικούς Συλλόγους και στα Περιοδικά [Public Discourse about Science in Greece, 1870-1900: Population Projects at the University of Athens, in Cultural Associations and Magazines] (PDF). Athens, GR: Department of History and Philosophy of Science of the University of Athens.
- Moulton, Forest Ray (1914). An Introduction to Celestial Mechanics. London, UK: Macmillan & Co. ISBN 9780598943972.
