= Fokas =

Fokas may refer to:

== Places ==
- Nikiforos Fokas, a former municipality in Crete

== People with the surname ==
- Manuel Fokas Greek Painter 1400-1460s
- Michael Fokas Greek Painter 1473-1504
- Athanassios S. Fokas, mathematician
- Nikos Fokas, poet, essayist and translator

== See also ==
- Focas (disambiguation)
