= Foca =

Foca or FOCA may refer to:

== Places ==
- Foča, a town in eastern Bosnia and Herzegovina
  - Foča massacres, atrocities perpetrated in the town of Foča during the 1992–1995 Bosnian War
- Foça, a town in Turkey, known as Phocaea in ancient times
- Foça Islands, an island group in the Bay of Izmir, Turkey

== Uses as an acronym ==
- Federal Office for Civil Aviation (disambiguation)
- Fellowship of Confessing Anglicans
- Fellowship of Christian Assemblies
- Font Object Content Architecture, part of MODCA
- Formula One Constructors' Association
- Freedom of Choice Act
- Forces Combattantes Abacunguzi

== Ships ==
- Foca-class submarine, a class of Italian Regia Marina (Royal Navy) submarines
- Foca-class submarine, three Italian F-class submarines sold to Portugal
- Foca-class submarine (Brazil), a class of Brazilian Navy submarines, also known as the F class
- NRP Foca, a Portuguese Navy submarine in commission from 1917 to 1935

== Other uses ==
- Foca, the Italian, Portuguese, and Spanish word for seal, a type of pinniped
- Foca camera, a brand of French-made rangefinder cameras
- Phocas, also called Foca, a Byzantine emperor between 602 and 610

== See also ==
- Focas (disambiguation)
