= Plakidis =

Plakidis is a surname. Notable people with the surname include:

- Pēteris Plakidis (1947–2017), Latvian composer and pianist
- Stavros Plakidis (1893–1991), Greek astronomer, professor, astrophysicist, mathematician and author
