= Demetrios Kokkidis =

Greek Astronomer and professor academic (1789 - 1852)

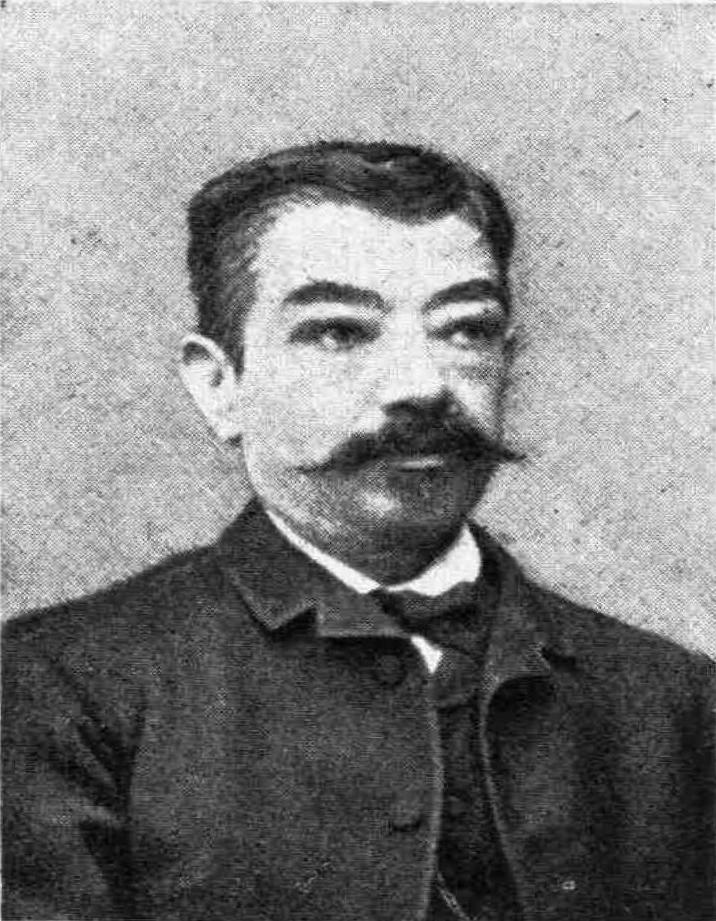

Dean of the School of Philosophy (University of Athens)
- In office 1887 – -1888
- Preceded by: Christos Papadopoulos
- Succeeded by: Konstantinos Mitsopoulos

Director of the National Observatory of Athens
- In office 1884–1890
- Preceded by: Julius Schmidt
- Succeeded by: Demetrios Eginitis

Personal details
- Born: November 4, 1840 Athens, Greece
- Died: February 11, 1896 (aged 55) Athens, Greece
- Profession: Professor, Dean
- Known for: Astronomy
- Scientific career
- Education: University of Berlin; Berlin Observatory; University of Paris
- Awards: Order of the Redeemer
- Fields: Geography; Astronomy; Meteorology; Climatology; Mathematics
- Workplaces: University of Athens; Evelpidon; National Observatory of Athens; Naval Academy
- Doctoral advisor: Johann Franz Encke
- Other academic advisors: Kosmas Kokkidis

Demetrios Kokkidis (Greek: Δημήτριος Κοκκίδης; November 4, 1840 – February 11, 1896) was a Greek astronomer, mathematician, physicist, professor, and dean. Kokkidis was the fourth president of the Athens Observatory after the death of Johann Friedrich Julius Schmidt. He was one of the few Greek astronomers of the 20th century following Georgios Konstantinos Vouris and Ioannis Papadakis. He did extensive research and wrote articles about Mercury, the Sun, the Moon, and various meteorological phenomena.

Demetrios was born in Athens. His father was Greek War Hero Kosmas Kokkidis. Kosmas also taught at Evelpidon and Demetri's brother Ifikratis Kokkidis was a prominent military engineer. From a young age, Demetrios showed signs of higher intelligence and attracted the attention of Greek entrepreneur and philanthropist Simon Sinas. Demetrios studied astronomy at the University of Berlin and the Berlin Observatory under the supervision of Johann Franz Encke. His dissertation in 1862 was entitled Variations of the Declinations of the Stars θ Ursa Major and β Draco (Variationibus Declinationum Stellarum θ Ursae Majoris et β Draconis). Demetrios also studied in Paris until 1877.

He returned to Greece and taught at three different institutions while writing for two publications Parnassos and Estia. He briefly served as Dean of the Philosophical School which was part of the University of Athens. For his distinguished contribution to the field of astronomy, he was awarded the Order of the Redeemer from Greece. He also received similar awards from Spain and Prussia. He died in Athens in 1896 at 55 years old.

== History ==
Kokkidis was born in Athens. He was from a prestigious academic family. His mother's name was Fani and his father's name was Kosmas Kokkidis. Kosmas fought in the Greek War of Independence and eventually became a professor at Evelpidon. Demetri's brother Ifikratis Kokkidis was also a soldier and a professor at Evelpidon. In October 1850, Demetrios attended the southern junior high school, and three years later in September 1853, he was accepted at the first royal high school of Athens. One of his professors was physicist and mathematician Athanasios Kyzikinos. Demetrios graduated with high honors in June 1858. Because he was an extraordinary student he attracted the attention of Greek philanthropist and royalist Simon Sinas. Sinas and his father Georgios Sinas were responsible for erecting the National Observatory of Athens. Both figures were associated with Greek astronomers Georgios Konstantinos Vouris and Johann Friedrich Julius Schmidt. Demetrios chose to study astronomy at the University of Berlin and the Berlin Observatory. His professor was world-renowned astronomer Johann Franz Encke; Demetrios was also affiliated with Karl Christian Bruhns while he was at the Observatory. He completed a dissertation in 1862 entitled: Variations of the Declinations of the Stars θ Ursa Major and β Draco (Variationibus Declinationum Stellarum θ Ursae Majoris et β Draconis) afterward he continued his studies in Paris until 1877 occasionally returning to Greece.

He permanently returned to Greece and was appointed curator of the Athens observatory on April 16, 1877. On March 30, 1881, he became a professor of astronomy at the University of Athens teaching geography, astronomy, meteorology, climatology, and mathematics. Demetrios also taught geodesics, astronomy, and higher mathematics at Evelpidon and the Hellenic Naval Academy following the footsteps of his father Kosmas. World-renowned Greek-German astronomer Johann Friedrich Julius Schmidt died in 1884. Kokkidis assumed his role as director of the Athens Observatory becoming the fourth director. During his tenure, he wrote countless articles in the field of astronomy and expanded the existing weather stations adding ones in Corfu, Zakynthos, and Larissa. He became dean of the Philosophical School in the academic year 1887–1888 which was part of the University of Athens.

He worked tirelessly to strengthen relations between the Athens Observatory and its international counterparts. He received the Order of the Redeemer from the Greek state and similar awards from Spain and Prussia for his contribution to astronomy. From 1840 to 1869 he was a consultant for the Athens Archaeological Society. He wrote for the publication Estia. Demetrios became a member of the scientific division of Parnassos Literary Society in 1870. The organization also featured a publication. The Parnassos club is now housed in a private mansion on St. George Square designed by his brother Ifikratis Kokkidis.

== Literary works ==
Books and Articles authored by Demetrios Kokkidis
Date	Title	Title in English
1862	Variationibus Declinationum Stellarum θ Ursae Majoris et β Draconis	Variations of the Declinations of the Stars θ Ursa Major and β Draco
1869	Έκθεσις περί του Αστεροσκοπείου Αθηνών	Observations made at the Athens Observatory
1871–1872	Περί Διπλών Αστέρων	Double Stars
1872–1873	Περί Πλανητικού Συστήματος	Planetary Systems
1876	Περί Ηλίου	The Sun
1878	Περί της Ανακαλύψεως Ουρανίων Σωμάτων δια του Υπολογισμού	On the Discovery of Heavenly Bodies through Computation
1890	Περί της Περί τον Ίδιον Άξονα Κινήσεως του Ερμού	The Motion of Mercury About its Axis

== Bibliography ==
- Stefanidis, Michail K. (1952). Εθνικόν και Καποδιστριακόν Πανεπιστήμιον Αθηνών Εκατονταετηρίς 1837-1937. Τόμος Ε′, Ιστορία της Φυσικομαθηματικής Σχολής [National and Kapodistrian University of Athens Centenary 1837-1937. Volume V, History of the Faculty of Physics and Mathematics] (PDF). Athens: National and Kapodistrian University of Athens.
- Savaidou, Irini Mergoupi (2010). 'Δημόσιος Λόγος περί Επιστήμης στην Ελλάδα, 1870–1900: Εκλαϊκευτικά Εγχειρήματα στο Πανεπιστήμιο Αθηνών, στους Πολιτιστικούς Συλλόγους και στα Περιοδικά [Public Discourse about Science in Greece, 1870-1900: Population Projects at the University of Athens, in Cultural Associations and Magazines] (PDF). Athens, GR: Department of History and Philosophy of Science of the University of Athens.
- Harvey, Stephen; Matsopoulos, Nicolas (2020). The Moon A Translation of Der Mond by Johann Friedrich Julius Schmidt. Horsham, United Kingdom: Springer. ISBN 978-3-030-37269-9.
- Theodossiou, E.Th.; Manimanis, V.N.; Mantarakis, P. (2007). "Demetrios Eginitis Restorer of the Athens Observatory" (PDF). Journal of Astronomical History and Heritage. 10 (2): 123–132. Bibcode:2007JAHH...10..123T. doi:10.3724/SP.J.1440-2807.2007.02.05. ISSN 1440-2807. S2CID 129260817.
- Tampakis, Kostas; Vlahakis, George N. (2020). Science and Literature: Imagination Medicine and Space (PDF). Athens, Greece: National Hellenic Research Foundation. ISBN 978-960-7905-78-9.
- Harprecht, Adalbertus (1862). De Computationibus Functionum Ellipticarum, Quarum Moduli Sunt Reales [On the Computations of Elliptic functions Whose modules are real.]. Berlin, Germany: University of Berlin.
- Kokkidis, Demetrios (1862). Variationibus Declinationum Stellarum θ Ursae Majoris et β Draconis [Variations of the Declinations of the Stars θ Ursa Major and β Draco] (PDF). Berlin, Germany: University of Berlin.
