= Johann Franz Encke =

German astronomer (1791–1865)

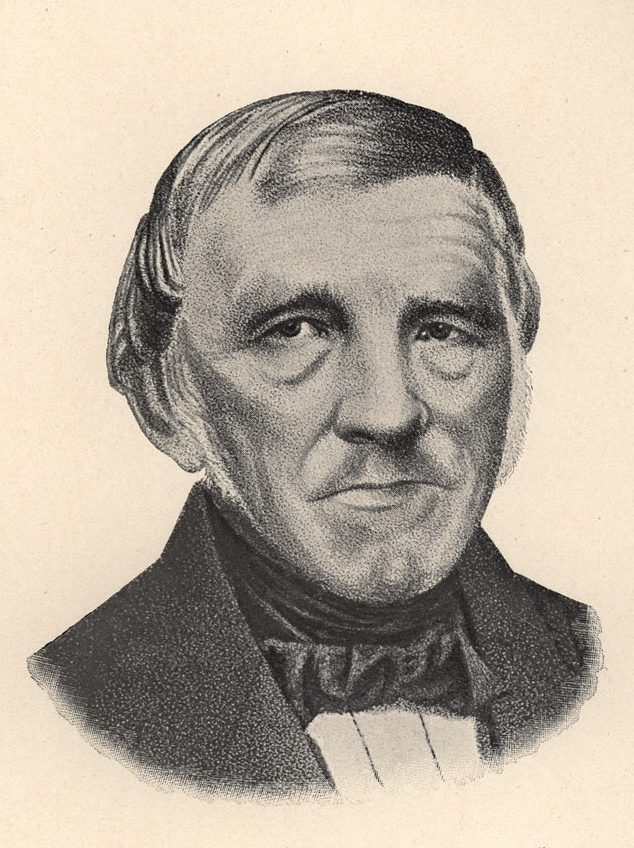
- Johann Franz Encke
- Born: 23 September 1791; Hamburg, Holy Roman Empire
- Died: 26 August 1865 (aged 73); Spandau (now part of Berlin), Province of Brandenburg
- Education: University of Göttingen
- Known for: 12P/Pons-Brooks comet
- Awards: Cotta prize (1817); Royal Medal (1828); Gold Medal of the Royal Astronomical Society (1824, 1830)
- Scientific career
- Fields: Astronomy
- Workplaces: University of Berlin
- Academic advisors: Carl Friedrich Gauss
- Doctoral students: Johann Gottfried Galle; Leopold Kronecker; Demetrios Kokkidis

Johann Franz Encke (German pronunciation: [ˈjoːhan ˈfʁants ˈɛŋkə]; 23 September 1791 – 26 August 1865) was a German astronomer. Among his activities, he worked on the calculation of the periods of comets and asteroids, measured the distance from the Earth to the Sun, and made observations of the planet Saturn.

== Biography ==
Encke was born in Hamburg, where his father was the Pastor at St. James' Church, Hamburg. He was the youngest of eight children, and at the time his father died, when he was four years old, the family was in straitened circumstances. Thanks to the financial assistance of a teacher, he was able to be educated at the Gelehrtenschule des Johanneums. He studied mathematics and astronomy from 1811 at the University of Göttingen under Carl Friedrich Gauss, but he enlisted in the Hanseatic Legion for the campaign of 1813–1814, serving as a sergeant in the artillery of the Prussian army, in Holstein and Mecklenburg. In 1814 he resumed his studies at the University, but after Napoleon's escape from Elba he returned to the military, serving until 1815 by which time he had become a lieutenant.

Having returned to Göttingen in 1816, he was at once appointed by Bernhardt von Lindenau as his assistant in the observatory of Seeberg near Gotha (he had become acquainted with von Lindenau during his military service). There he completed his investigation of the comet of 1680, for which the Cotta prize was awarded to him in 1817 by judges Gauss and Olbers. He correctly assigned a period of 71 years to the comet of 1812, now known as 12P/Pons-Brooks.

Following a suggestion by Jean-Louis Pons, who suspected one of the three comets discovered in 1818 to be the same one already discovered by him in 1805, Encke began to calculate the orbital elements of this comet. At this time, all the known comets had an orbital period of seventy years and more, with an aphelion far beyond the orbit of Uranus. The most famous comet of this family was Comet Halley with its period of seventy-six years. Therefore the orbit of the comet discovered by Pons was a sensation, because his orbit was found to have a period of 3.3 years, so that the aphelion had to be within the orbit of Jupiter. Encke predicted its return for 1822; this return was observable only from the southern hemisphere and was seen by Carl Ludwig Christian Rümker in Australia. The comet was also identified with the one seen by Pierre Méchain in 1786 and by Caroline Herschel in 1795.

Encke sent his calculations as a note to Gauss, Olbers, and Bessel. His former mathematics professor published this note and Encke became famous as the discoverer of the short periodic comets. The first object of this family, the Encke comet, was named after him and so it is one of the few comets not named after the discoverer, but after the one who calculated the orbit. Later this comet was identified as the origin of the Taurids meteor showers.

The importance of the predicted return based on the calculation by Encke was rewarded by the Royal Astronomical Society in London by presenting their Gold Medal to him in 1824. In this year Encke married Amalie Becker (1787–1879), daughter of author, bookseller and publisher Rudolph Zacharias Becker, the publisher of works from the Seeberg Observatory. They had three sons and two daughters. In 1825 he was elected a Fellow of the Royal Society.

Eight masterly treatises on the comet's movements were published by him in the Berliner Abhandlungen (1829–1859). From a fresh discussion of the transits of Venus in 1761 and 1769 he deduced a solar parallax of 8.57 arcsecond. This and the corresponding distance to the sun were long accepted as authoritative. His results were published in two separate tracts, entitled Die Entfernung der Sonne (The distance to the Sun, 1822–1824).

In 1822 he became director of the Seeberg observatory, and in 1825 was promoted to a corresponding position at Berlin, where a new observatory, built under his superintendence and with the support of Alexander von Humboldt and King Frederick William III of Prussia, was inaugurated in 1835. Mostly on the recommendation of Bessel, Encke became director of the new observatory and secretary of the Academy of Sciences. He directed the preparation of the star maps of the Academy (1830–1859); beginning in 1830, he edited and greatly improved the Astronomisches Jahrbuch; and he issued four volumes of the Astronomische Beobachtungen auf der Sternwarte zu Berlin (Observations of the Berlin observatory, 1840–1857). Thereafter Encke was involved in the discovery and orbital parameter determination of other short periodic comets and asteroids.

In 1837, Encke described a broad variation in the brightness of the A Ring of Saturn. The Encke Gap was later named in honour of his observations of Saturn's rings.

In 1844, Encke became professor of astronomy at the University of Berlin. Much labour was bestowed by him upon facilitating the computation of the movements of the asteroids. With this end in view he expounded to the Berlin Academy in 1849 a mode of determining an elliptic orbit from three observations, and communicated to that body in 1851 a new method of calculating planetary perturbations by means of rectangular coordinates (republished in W. Ostwald's Klassiker der exacten Wissenschaften, No. 141, 1903).

Encke visited England in 1840. He was elected a foreign member of the Royal Swedish Academy of Sciences in 1836, a member to the American Philosophical Society in 1839, and a Foreign Honorary Member of the American Academy of Arts and Sciences in 1849. Incipient brain-disease compelled him to withdraw from official life in November 1863. He still was director of the Berlin observatory until his death on 26 August 1865 in Spandau. His successor was Wilhelm Julius Foerster.

He contributed extensively to the periodical literature of astronomy.

Encke's grave is preserved at a cemetery in the Kreuzberg section of Berlin, the Friedhof II der Jerusalems- und Neuen Kirchengemeinde (Cemetery No. II of the congregations of Jerusalem's Church and New Church) (entrance: opposite to 58–60, Zossener Str.; 61, Baruther Str. only for vehicles of the cemetery). His grave is close to that of the mathematician Carl Gustav Jacob Jacobi.

== Honors ==
- Twice, in 1824 and 1830, the recipient of the Gold Medal of the Royal Astronomical Society.
- The crater Encke on the Moon is named after him.
- Asteroid 9134 Encke is named in his honour.
- The Encke gap of Saturn's rings is named after him.
- Comet Encke is named after him for his calculation of its orbit.
