= Jean Focas =

Greek-French astronomer (1909–1969)

Jean-Henri Focas
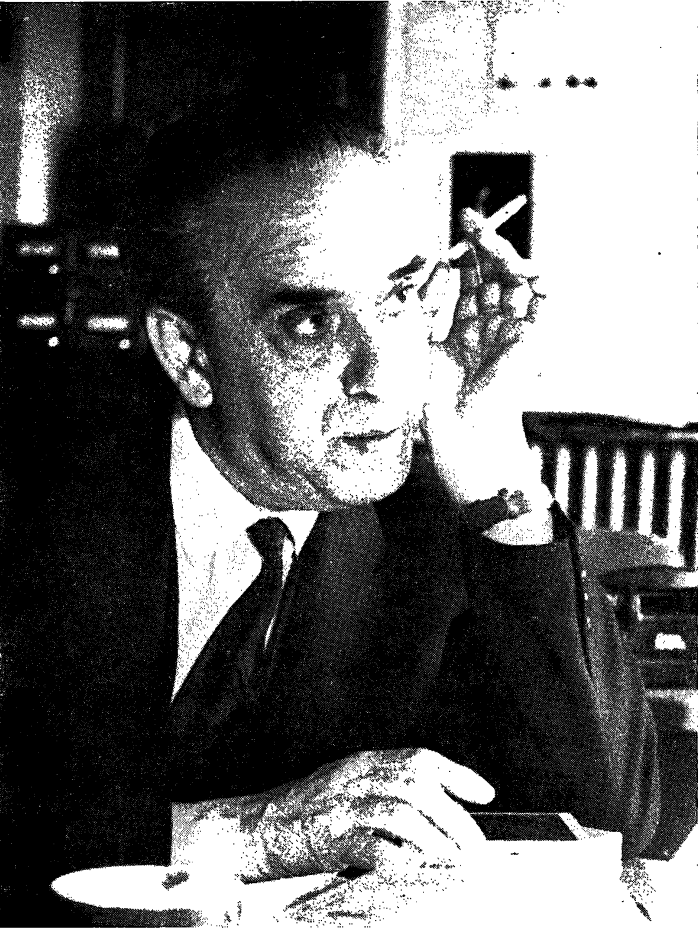
- Born: 20 July 1909; Corfu, Greece
- Died: 3 January 1969 (aged 59); Athens, Greece
- Education: University of Paris
- Known for: Focas (lunar crater)
- Children: Errikos Fokas
- Scientific career
- Fields: Astronomy; Physics; Celestial Cartography
- Workplaces: National Observatory of Athens; Pic du Midi; Meudon Great Refractor
- Doctoral advisors: Audouin Dollfus; André-Louis Danjon

Jean-Henri Focas (Greek: Ιωάννης Ε. Φωκάς; 20 July 1909 – 3 January 1969) was a Greek-French astronomer, painter, designer, illustrator, astrophysicists, photographer, and celestial cartographer who spoke five languages. He performed visual studies of planetary surfaces from the National Observatory of Athens, Pic du Midi, and Meudon Great Refractor. Jean is responsible for creating the most highly visual map of Mars ever created by a visual observer of the planet. He developed special photographic equipment to photograph celestial phenomena. In 1961, he published Étude Photométrique et Polarimétrique des Phénomènes Saisonniers de la Planéte Mar (Photometric and Polarimetric Study of the Seasonal Phenomena of the Planet Mars) which became a classic on the subject of polarimetric investigation of Mars. A crater on the Moon and a crater on Mars were named after him because of his contribution to the field.

Jean was born on the Greek island of Corfu. When he was in high school he would frequently visit a small astronomical station on Kogevina hill in Corfu built by lunar photographer Félix Chemla Lamèch. Félix was impressed by Jean's artistic abilities and Jean became his apprentice and began to learn about the field of astronomy firsthand. Félix taught him how to make complex astronomical observations. Jean's impressive abilities garnered the attention of Greek astronomer Stavros Plakidis who recommended the young astronomer to the head of the National Observatory of Athens Demetrios Eginitis. Fokas became an assistant at the observatory around 1931. He began writing papers that were published internationally. World War II took a harsh toll on Greek astronomical research during the early 1940s. By the 1950s, Jean traveled back and forth to France. By the age of 45, he had become known within the international astronomical community.

While he was at the Pic du Midi he performed a photometric study from 663 negatives that he contributed to collecting himself which he used to determine 7200 different regions of the surfaces of different astronomical phenomena namely planets and moons. He was a member of the Société astronomique de France, French Academy of Sciences, and the International Astronomical Union and an advocate of the international collaboration of astronomy. He died prematurely of a heart attack while he was visiting Athens, Greece at 59 years old.

== History ==
Fokas was born in Corfu. His father's name was Errikos. Jean's son also bears the same name. From a young age, Jean showed a fascination for astronomy. Luckily lunar photographer Félix Chemla Lamèch built a small astronomical station on Kogevina Hill in Corfu. Jean met Felix while he was still in high school and showed the astronomer his amazing artistic skills. He painted and drew incredibly detailed depictions of the major planets. Jean also began to make complex astronomical observations. He became Felix's apprentice and learned about astronomy hands-on. Jean Focas became the general secretary of the Astronomical Society of Greece at 18 years of age. The society was started by Felix and based in Corfu. Eventually, the young astronomer was introduced to Stavros Plakidis around 1931.

Plakidis recommended Fokas to Demetrios Eginitis the then-head of the National Observatory of Athens. Fokas impressed both astronomers and was hired as an assistant at the observatory. The astronomer spent a large portion of his life at the observatory learning from Plakidis, Eginitis, and the other astronomers associated with the observatory. He wrote papers and continued his complex artistic rendering of different elements in the Solar System such as sunspots, variable stars, comets, and mainly the terrain of various planets. He wrote an article in 1937 entitled Observations of Saturn's Rings. While he was at the Athens observatory he designed complex instrumentation. One such instrument was a camera made of plywood and black velvet used to photograph images seen through the telescope.

During the late 1930s, Plakidis lobbied to move the astronomical station to Penteli which began functioning in 1937. Regrettably, when the Nazis invaded Greece most of the instrumentation of the observatories were dismantled and hidden from the Third Reich. After the war Focas wrote La Planète Saturne (The Planet Saturn) in 1948. By the early fifties, he continued his research in astrophysics and wrote a paper on the polarized light of the Moon during the total lunar eclipse of January 29–30, 1953, in Athens which was presented by André Danjon to the French Academy of Sciences. One year later in 1954, he traveled to South France at the Pyrenees Mountains to view astronomical subject matter at the newly built 60 cm telescope of the Pic du Midi Observatory. About ten years later, the same facility was used by NASA to prep for the Apollo Moon landing. When he returned to Athens he introduced new photographic, polarimetric, and micrometric observation methods developed in the French observatories.

By this point, Focas traveled to France once a year using the Observatory of Meudon working in collaboration with the National Observatory of Athens. He also continued visiting various observatories all over France. By 1961, he was awarded a Ph.D. from the University of Paris for his thesis entitled Étude Photométrique et Polarimétrique des Phénomènes Saisonniers de la Planéte Mars (Photometric and Polarimetric Study of the Seasonal Phenomena of the Planet Mars).

In early 1964, he traveled to Arizona to visit the Lowell Observatory. He assessed all the plates collected by American astronomer Earl C. Slipher and closely participated in the coordinated operations carried out by the International Astronomical Union collaborating with both the American and French observatories to build two planetary photographic centers at the Lowell and Meudon observatories. That same year Stavros Plakidis retired and according to Fokas' son Errikos his father had a disagreement with the leadership at the National Observatory of Athens and Fokas permanently moved to France. By this period Fokas carried out more than a thousand photometric measurements on Jupiter, which formed the basis of his work on the long-term evolution of cloud formations in the upper atmosphere of the planet.

Throughout his life, Focas focused on mastering the use of the equatorial and the meridian telescopes, micrometer, celestial photometry and astro photographic equipment. He built on the work of his predecessors Evgenios Antoniadis and Bernard Lyot. He has been honored by countless institutions around the world. Regrettably, he died prematurely at age 59 on 3 January 1969 from a heart attack while in Greece, where he was visiting for the holidays. His biography was written by one of his mentors' French astronomer Audouin Dollfus. Craters on the Moon and Mars were named after Jean, namely the Focas lunar crater in the southern hemisphere of the Moon, with a diameter of 22 km, as well as the Focas Martian crater in the northern hemisphere of Mars with a diameter of 76.5 km.

== Literary works ==
Books and Articles authored by Jean-Henri Focas
Date	Title	Title in English
1948	La Planète Saturne	The Planet Saturn
1961	Étude Photométrique et Polarimétrique des Phénomènes Saisonniers de la Planéte Mars	Photometric and Polarimetric Study of the Seasonal Phenomena of the Planet Mars
1966	Recherche Géologique Lunaire	Lunar Geological Research
1967	Transparence de l'Atmosphère Martienne et Visibilité des Détails de la Surface dans le Bleu et Ultra-Violet	Transparency of the Martian Atmosphere and Visibility of Surface Details in Blue and Ultra-Violet

Books and Articles authored by Jean-Henri Focas
Date	Title
1937	Observations of Saturn's Ring
1963	Preliminary Results Concerning the Atmospheric Activity of Jupiter and Saturn

== See also ==
- Phokas (Byzantine family)

== Bibliography ==
- Dollfus, Audouin (May 1970). "Jean-Henri Focas" [Jean-Henri Focas] (PDF). L'Astronomie (in French). 84. Bibcode:1970LAstr..84..217D.
- Plakidis, Stavros (1946). "Astronomy in Greece During the War". The Observatory. 66 (832). London, UK. Bibcode:1946Obs....66..298P.
- Sheehan, William; Westfall, John (2014). Celestial Shadows Eclipses, Transits, and Occultations. New York, NY: Springer Publishing. ISBN 9781493915354.
- Sheehan, William; Bell, Jim (2021). The Planet Mars A History of Observation and Discovery. Phoenix, Arizona: University of Arizona Press. ISBN 9780816546862.
- Dollfus, Audouin (2013). The Great Refractor of Meudon Observatory. New York, NY: Springer Publishing. ISBN 9781461472889.
- Blunck, Jürgen (1977). Mars and Its Satellites A Detailed Commentary on the Nomenclature. New York, NY: Exposition Press. ISBN 9780682486767.
- Krikkis, Stefanos (20 June 2002). "Ο Έλληνας "Γεωγράφος" του Ηλιακού Συστήματος" [The Greek "Geographer" of the Solar System] (in Greek). Athens, Greece: Ta Nea. Archived from the original on 18 April 2023.
- Zoumbos, Giorgos (20 February 2017). "Το Αστεροσκοπείο της Κέρκυρας (1924-1940)" [The Corfu Observatory (1924-1940)] (in Greek). Corfu, Greece: Corfu History. Archived from the original on 28 November 2022.
