= Time in Greece =

Time in Europe: Light Blue / Western European Time / Greenwich Mean Time (UTC); Blue / Western European Time / Greenwich Mean Time (UTC); Blue / Western European Summer Time / British Summer Time / Irish Standard Time (UTC+1); Red / Central European Time (UTC+1); Red / Central European Summer Time (UTC+2); Yellow / Eastern European Time / Kaliningrad Time (UTC+2); Ochre / Eastern European Time (UTC+2); Ochre / Eastern European Summer Time (UTC+3); Green / Moscow Time / Turkey Time (UTC+3); Turquoise / Armenia Time / Azerbaijan Time / Georgia Time / Samara Time (UTC+4); ▉▉▉▉ Pale hues: Standard time observed all year ▉▉▉ Dark hues: Daylight saving time

In Greece, the standard time is Eastern European Time (Greek: Ώρα Ανατολικής Ευρώπης; EET; UTC+02:00). Daylight saving time, which moves one hour ahead to UTC+03:00 is observed from the last Sunday in March to the last Sunday in October. Greece adopted EET in 1916; before that, Athens mean time (1 hour, 34 minutes, and 52 seconds ahead of GMT) was observed.

== Time notation ==
The 12-hour notation is used in verbal communication, but the 24-hour format is also used along with the 12-hour notation in writing. The minutes are usually written with two digits; the hour numbers are written with or without a leading zero.

== IANA time zone database ==
In the IANA time zone database, Greece is given the zone Europe/Athens.

c.c.*	coordinates*	TZ*	Comments	UTC offset	DST
GR	+3758+02343	Europe/Athens		+02:00	+03:00

== See also ==
- Time in Europe
- List of time zones by country
- List of time zones by UTC offset
