= Focas (lunar crater) =

Crater on the Moon

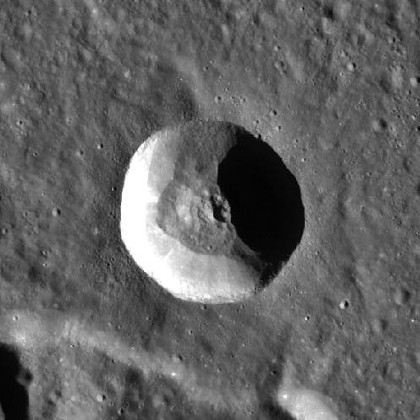
- LRO WAC image
- Coordinates: 33.7°S 93.91°W
- Diameter: 22.04 km (13.70 mi)
- Depth: Unknown
- Colongitude: 94° at sunrise
- Eponym: Ionnas Focas

Focas is a small lunar impact crater that lies on the far side of the Moon, just past the southwestern limb. In this location the crater is occasionally brought into view due to libration, but not much detail can be seen because the crater is viewed from the side.

The crater is situated in the wide valley between the ring-shaped Montes Rook in the north and Montes Cordillera range in the south. These ranges form a double-ring around the Mare Orientale impact basin. The crater is located toward the southern end of this immense feature, just to the north of the Montes Cordillera range. Focas is a relatively isolated crater, with the nearest craters of note being the Wright–Shaler crater pair some distance to the east along the same interior edge of the Montes Cordillera.

This is a roughly circular crater with an interior floor about half the total diameter. It is symmetrical in form, with only some slight appearance of wear along the rim. The inner wall displays evidence of numerous landslides. The interior floor contains no features or impacts of note.

Focas crater is named after Jean-Henri Focas (1909–1969), a Greco-French astronomer. Its designation was formally adopted by the International Astronomical Union in 1970.

== Satellite craters ==
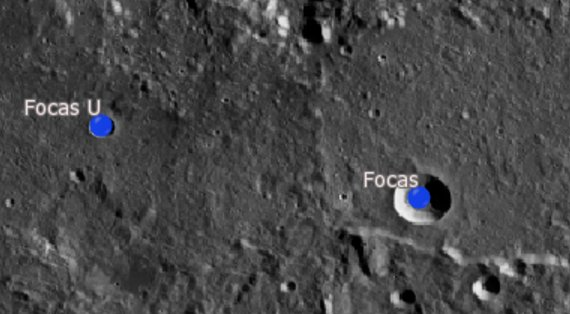
Satellite feature of Focas crater

By convention this feature is identified on lunar maps by placing the letter on the side of the crater midpoint that is closest to Focas.

Focas	Latitude	Longitude	Diameter
U	32.7° S	98.5° W	10 km
