= Federal Office for Civil Aviation =

The Federal Office for Civil Aviation can refer to:

- Federal Office for Civil Aviation of Germany
- Federal Office of Civil Aviation, Switzerland
