= Nikos Fokas =

Greek poet, essayist, and translator (1927–2021)

Nikos Fokas (Greek: Νίκος Φωκάς; 1927 – 26 July 2021) was a Greek poet, essayist and translator.

== Life ==
Fokas was born in Cephalonia, Greece, in 1927, and educated in Athens, Greece. In the 1960s he lived in London and worked for the BBC World Service. On his return to Greece he worked as a free-lance journalist for the Hellenic Broadcasting Corporation until his retirement in 1982. He lived in Athens with his wife, Angela.

== Poetry ==
Fokas published numerous collections of poetry. The publication in 2002 of his Collected Poems: 1954-2000 brought his works to the attention of a wider audience. In 2005, he received the Grand Prize in Literature from the Greek Ministry of Culture and the Medal of Distinction in Letters from the Athens Academy of Arts and Sciences.

Fokas’s works have been the subject of translation. In 2010, a selection of his poems between 1981 and 2000 was published by Ypsilon Books (Athens), translated and prefaced by Don Schofield, under the title The Known (τά γνωστά).

Fokas's papers (manuscripts of his poems, essays and translations, correspondence, notes, photographs, and some audio material) were given by Fokas and his wife to the American School of Classical Studies at Athens.

== Critical reception ==
According to the literary critic Alexis Ziras, "Fokas’ work, from his early collections to his latest pieces, is pervaded by an endeavour to crystallise marginal emotions – an endeavour which we might say traces a parallel path to that of contemporary painting", while Thanasis Valtinos, a member of the Academy of Athens, has said:

Fokas is a unique and singular presence in our postwar poetry. His poetic work - dense, solid, unpredictable - distinguishes itself from the plethora of poems by his peers through its depth of reflection, its poetic clarity, the precision of its design, and its stringent antilyrical tone.

== Translations ==
Fokas’s translations into Greek include:

- Prosper Mérimée’s Carmen (1983)
- Janusz Głowacki’s General Strike (1984)
- Charles Baudelaire’s Les paradis artificiels (1986)
- Thomas De Quincey’s Confessions of an English Opium-Eater (1987)
- Amalia Fleming’s A Piece of Truth (1995)
- Robert Frost, Twenty-five poems (1997)
