= Stavros Plakidis =

Greek astronomer and professor

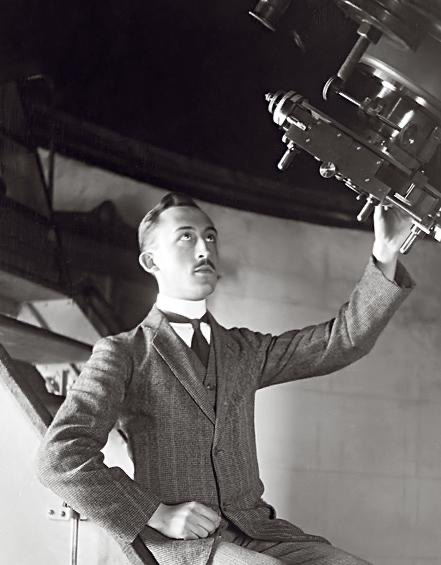

Personal details
- Born: May 22, 1893 Constantinople, Ottoman Empire
- Died: January 30, 1991 (aged 97) Athens, Greece
- Profession: Professor, Dean, Astronomer
- Scientific career
- Education: University of Athens
- Known for: Penteli Astronomical Station; Evgenides Planetarium; Variable Stars
- Fields: Astronomy; Astrophysics; Mathematics
- Workplaces: University of Athens; National Observatory of Athens; Evgenides Planetarium
- Doctoral advisor: Demetrios Eginitis; Arthur Eddington
- Notable students: Jean Focas

Stavros Plakidis (Greek: Σταύρος Πλακίδης; May 22, 1893 – January 1, 1991) was an astronomer, professor, astrophysicist, mathematician, author, and director of the Astronomical Institute of the National Observatory of Athens and intermittently served as chairman of the National Observatory. He is considered the father of modern astronomy in Greece. Plakidis made systematic observations of variable stars, novae, planets (Mars, Jupiter, Saturn, and Mercury), minor planets, stellar parallaxes, orbits of comets, and double stars, also contributing to the accurate geographic coordinates of the Athens Observatory. Plakidis independently discovered V1500 Cygni several hours after Minoru Honda claimed the find in Japan.

Plakidis was born in Constantinople. He attended the University of Athens and became an assistant astronomer at the National Observatory under Demetrios Eginitis eventually traveling to Europe to study in Italy, France, Germany, and England. While in England he collaborated with Arthur Eddington on a paper entitled the Irregularities of the Period of Long-Period Variable Stars and by 1931 Plakidis was awarded a Ph.D. He returned to Greece and became an astronomy professor at the University of Athens. He also worked at the National Observatory of Athens remaining at both institutions until 1964.

Plakidis was honored by countless international institutions for his work in the field of astronomy. He helped erect the Penteli Observatory and added a solar physics section to the National Observatory of Athens while also modernizing the instrumentation. He continued his research on variable stars throughout his life publishing articles in dozens of international publications. He was a member of the Société astronomique de France, French Association of Variable Star Observers, Royal Astronomical Society, and British Astronomical Association. Plakidis also frequently attended meetings of the International Astronautical Federation. He was the first director of the Evgenides Planetarium. He died in Athens Greece at the age of 97.

== Biography ==
Plakidis was born in Constantinople. He finished his early education in Constantinople in 1911 at the Great School of the Nation. He migrated to Athens and graduated from the School of Physics and Mathematics of the University of Athens in 1915. One of his professors included Demetrios Eginitis. Plakidis was appointed assistant at the National Observatory of Athens from 1915 to 1928. He also became a lab administrator at the astronomical lab of the University of Athens. Eginitis was the director of the facility. Because of his academic achievements in the field of astronomy, Plakidis received a scholarship and spent two years at different European observatories. He traveled to Italy, the German city Heidelberg and the French cities of Paris, Meudon, and Lyon. He also visited the English cities of Greenwich and Cambridge constantly participating in astronomical research. While he was at Cambridge he studied with Professor Sir Arthur Eddington. Plakidis and Eddington published a paper entitled the Irregularities of the Period of Long-Period Variable Stars which attracted international attention and by 1931 Plakidis was awarded a Ph.D. He returned to Athens and was awarded a position at the University of Athens after the death of Eginitis in 1934. Around the same period, he became the director of the Astronomical Institute of the National Observatory and frequently served as chairman of the National Observatory.

While he worked at the National Observatory of Athens he developed new instruments and added a section for solar physics. One year before the Space Race began in 1954 Plakidis spent one year at the Yerkes Observatory in the United States of America. He also participated in the establishment of the Penteli Observatory containing a 63 cm Newall telescope which was donated by Cambridge University in 1955 because of Plakidis's lifelong research relationship with Sir Arthur Eddington. Plakidis continued his research on variable stars throughout his life writing papers for different local and international publications. He published books on spherical astronomy, astrophysics, and practical astronomy. He was an observational astronomer. Some of his observations were published in the Annals of the Academy of Athens, Annales de l'Observatoire National d'Athenes, Royal Astronomical Society, Harvard College Observatory Bulletin, Astronomische Nachrichten, Journal des Observateurs, Ciel et Terre, Comptes rendus de l'Académie des Sciences, and Bulletin de l'Observatoire de Lyon.

He made systematic observations on variable stars, double stars, novae, solar eclipses, stellar parallaxes, and the planets Mars, Jupiter, Saturn, and Mercury. He was the first director of the Evgenides Planetarium and developed the facility. He retired in 1964 and became honorary director of the Astronomical Institute and emeritus professor at the University of Athens. He continued observational astronomy until his death. In 1974, he independently discovered V1500 Cygni several hours after Minoru Honda registered the discovery in Japan. That same year he was honored by a publication of his works entitled In honorem S. Placidis :special volume dedicated to Professor S. Plakidis on his 80th birthday. He died on January 30, 1991, at 97 years old.

== Publications ==
Books and articles authored by Stavros Plakidis
Date	Title	Title in English
1939	Ο Γαλαξίας και η Σχέσις Αυτού Προς το Σύμπαν	The Galaxy and its Relationship to the Universe
1939	Το Αστρον τής Βηθλεέμ	The Star of Bethlehem
1947	Αἱ Σύγχρονοι Αστρονομικαί Έρευναι και η Συμβολή της Ελλάδος εις την Διεθνή Συνεργασίαν	Modern Astronomical Research and Greece's Contribution to International Cooperation
1948	Οι Μεταβλητοί Αστέρες και ο Τρόπος Παρατηρήσεως Αυτών	How to Observe Variable Stars
1948	Λαϊκή Αστρονομία	Popular Astronomy
1953	Τρεις Μεγάλοι Ερευνηταί	Three Great Researchers (Edward Arthur Milne, James Jeans, and Arthur Eddington
1958	Πρακτική Αστρονομία	Practical Astronomy
1960	Εισαγωγή εις την Φυσικήν Αστρονομίαν	Introduction to Physical Astronomy
1969	Τό Ἐθνικόν Ἀστεροσκοπεῖον Ἀθηνῶν καί τό Έργον του (1842-1965)	The National Observatory of Athens and its Work (1842-1965)
1974	Η Αστρονομία και το Θρησκευτικόν Συναίσθημα	Religious Views on Astronomy
1992	Η Μυθολογία, η Ονοματολογία και τα Αξιοπαρατήρητα των Αστερισμών	The Mythology, Nomenclature and Observation of the Constellations

Books and articles authored by Demetrios Eginitis in English
Date	Title
1929	Irregularities of Period of Long-period Variable Stars
1946	Astronomy in Greece During the War
1960	Astronomy in Modern Greece
1974	In honorem S. Placidis :Special Volume Dedicated to Professor S. Plakidis on his 80th birthday

== See also ==
- UFO sightings in Greece

== Bibliography ==
- Stefanidis, Michail K. (1952). Εθνικόν και Καποδιστριακόν Πανεπιστήμιον Αθηνών Εκατονταετηρίς 1837-1937. Τόμος Ε′, Ιστορία της Φυσικομαθηματικής Σχολής [National and Kapodistrian University of Athens Centenary 1837-1937. Volume V, History of the Faculty of Physics and Mathematics] (PDF). Athens: National and Kapodistrian University of Athens.
- Contopoulos, G. (1991). "Obituaries S. Plakidis (1893-1991)". Quarterly Journal of the Royal Astronomical Society. 32 (4). Bibcode:1991QJRAS..32..483C.
- Andrikopoulos, Nikolaos; Tzavidopoulos, Ilias (2021). "Φυσικής Σκέψης" [Thoughts on Physics] (PDF). Athens Gr.: American University of Athens.
- Contopoulos, George (2004). Adventures in Order and Chaos: A Scientific Autobiography. Dordrecht, Netherlands: Kluwer Academic Publishers. ISBN 1-4020-3040-1.
- Novello, Màrio; Bergliaffa, Santiago Perez (2005). Proceedings of the Tenth Marcel Grossmann Meeting on General Relativity Rio De Janeiro, Brazil. Hackensack, NJ: World Scientific. ISBN 981-256-667-8.
- Nicolaidis, Efthymios; Emanuel, Susan (2011). Science and Eastern Orthodoxy From the Greek Fathers to the Age of Globalization. Baltimore, MD: Johns Hopkins University Press. ISBN 9781421402987.
- Hutchins, Roger (2017). British University Observatories 1772–1939. London, UK: Taylor & Francis. ISBN 9781351954525.
- Eddington, A.S.; Plakidis, S. (1929). "Irregularities of Period of Long Period Variable Stars". Monthly Notices of the Royal Astronomical Society. 90 (1). London, UK: 65–71. doi:10.1093/mnras/90.1.65.
