= Meudon Great Refractor =

Double telescope in Meudon, France

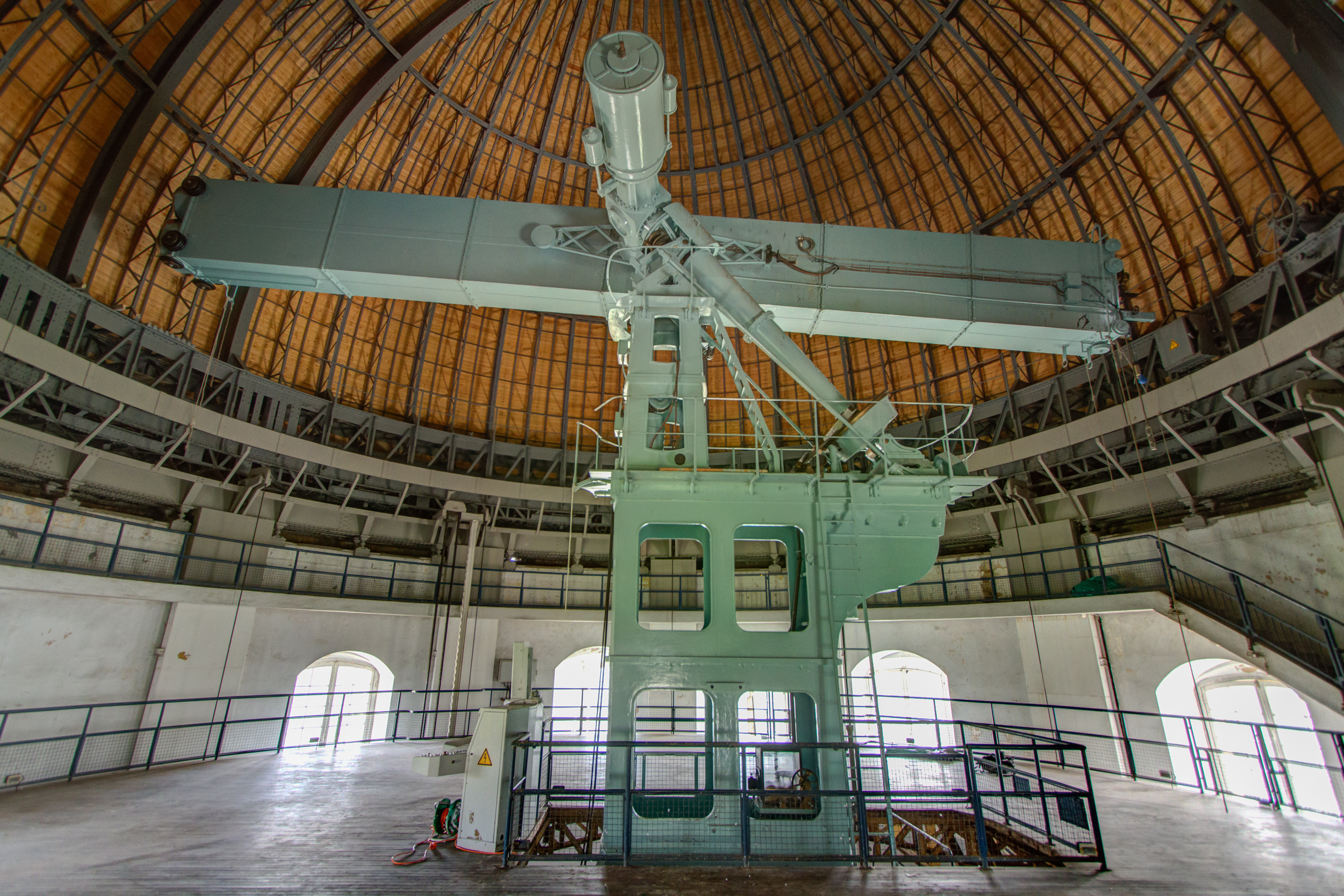
- Alternative names: Grande Lunette
- Location(s): Meudon, Hauts-de-Seine, Île-de-France, Metropolitan France, France
- Coordinates: 48°48′18″N 2°13′52″E
- Location of Meudon Great Refractor

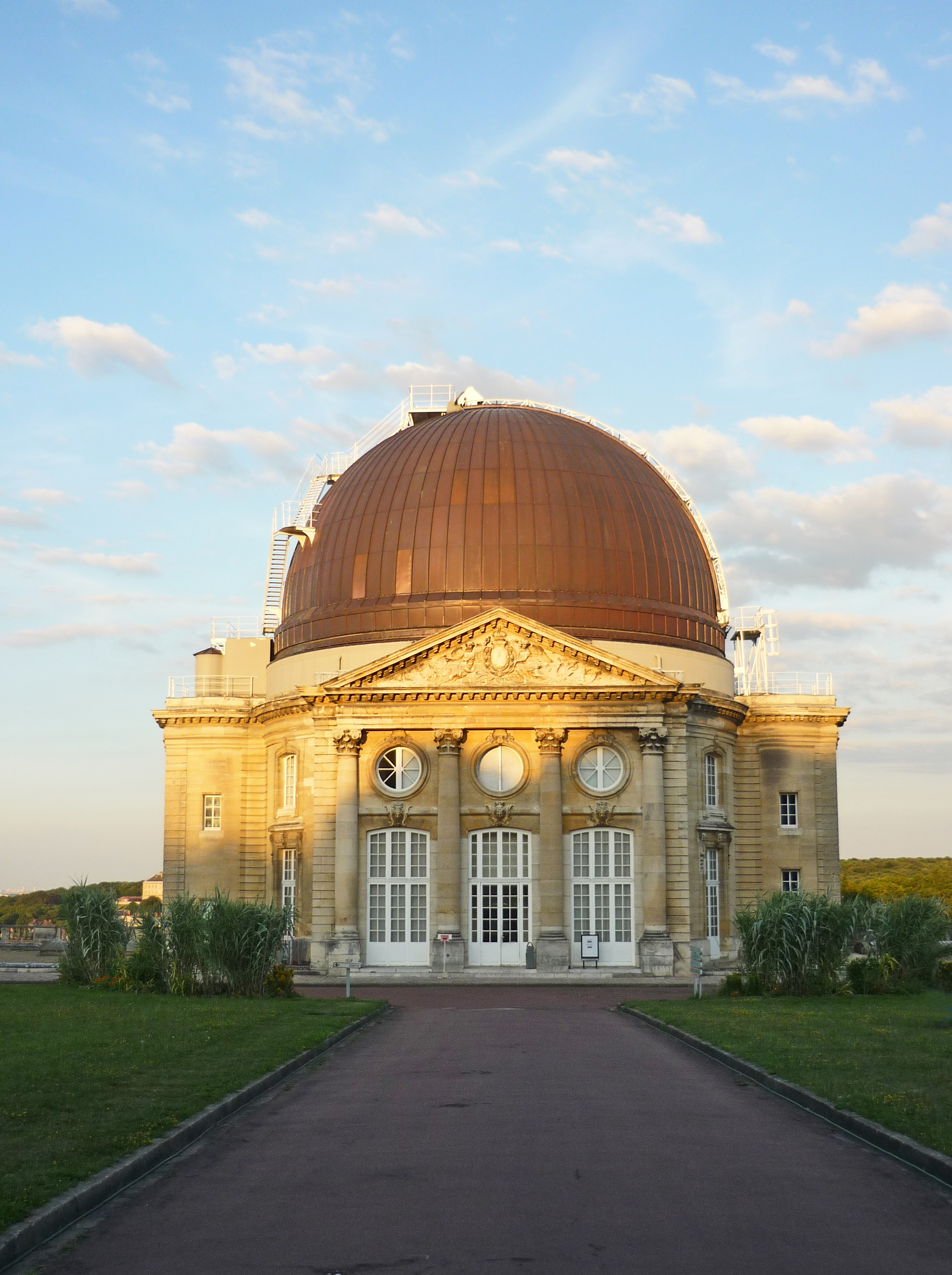
The renovated Grande Coupole

Meudon Great Refractor (also known as the Grande Lunette) is a double telescope with lenses (83 cm + 62 cm), in Meudon, France. It is a twin refracting telescope built in 1891, with one visual and one photographic, on a single square-tube together on an equatorial mount, inside a dome. The Refractor was built for the Meudon Observatory, and is the largest double doublet (twin achromat) refracting telescope in Europe, but about the same size as several telescopes in this period, when this style of telescope was popular. Other large telescopes of a similar type include the James Lick telescope (91.4), Potsdam Great Refractor (80+50 cm), and the Greenwich 28 inch refractor (71.1 cm).

Institutionally it was part of the Meudon Observatory, which later became integrated with the Paris observatory.

The Great Refractor was used for research well into the 1980s, after nearly a century of use. In the 21st century it was renovated and re-opened for public outreach.

The telescope is noted for being used to disprove the theory of Martian canals, which was a popular story in the late 19th century.

The telescope lenses were made by the Henry Brothers, and the mounting was made by Gautier.

== Background and development ==
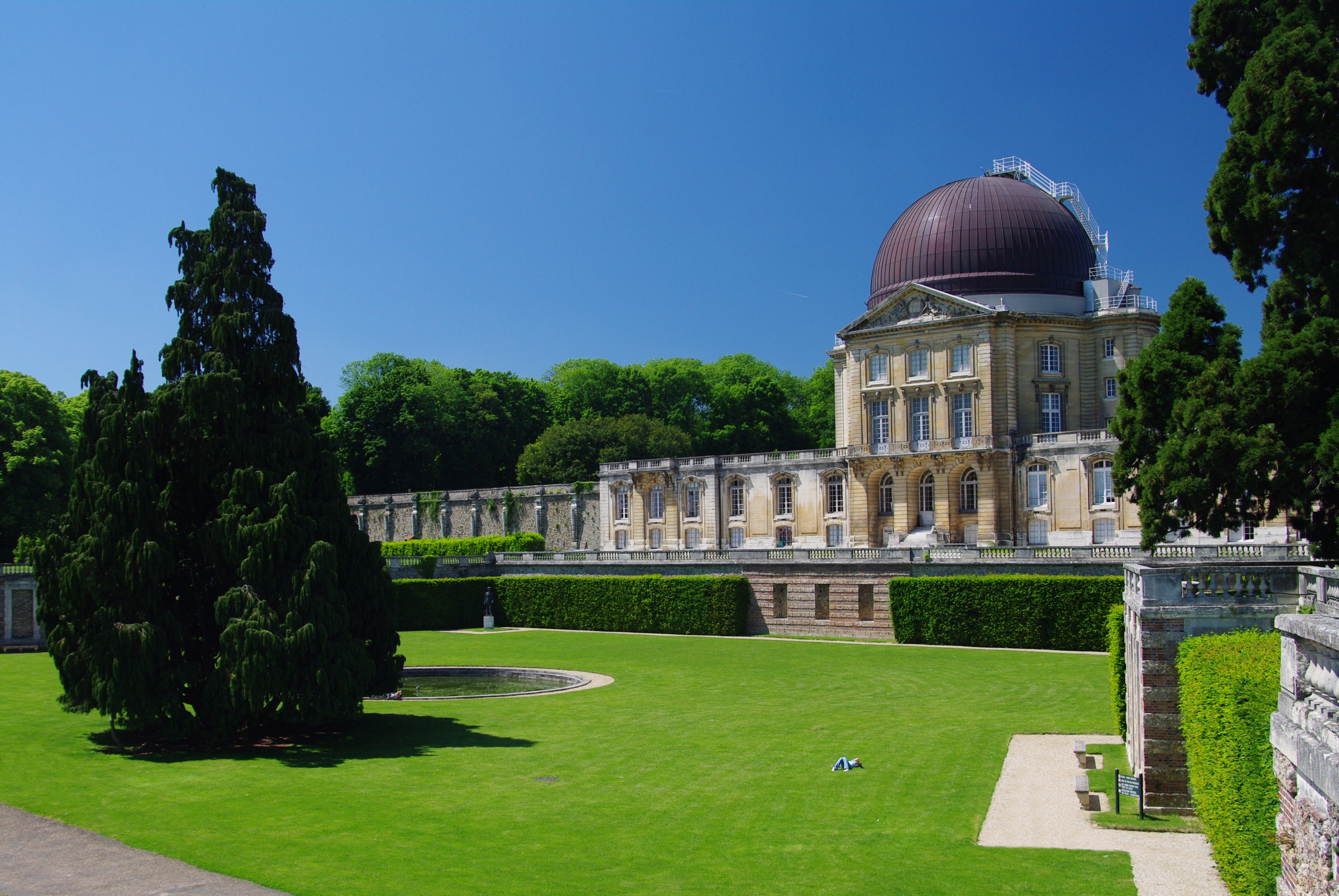
The observatory is surrounded by gardens

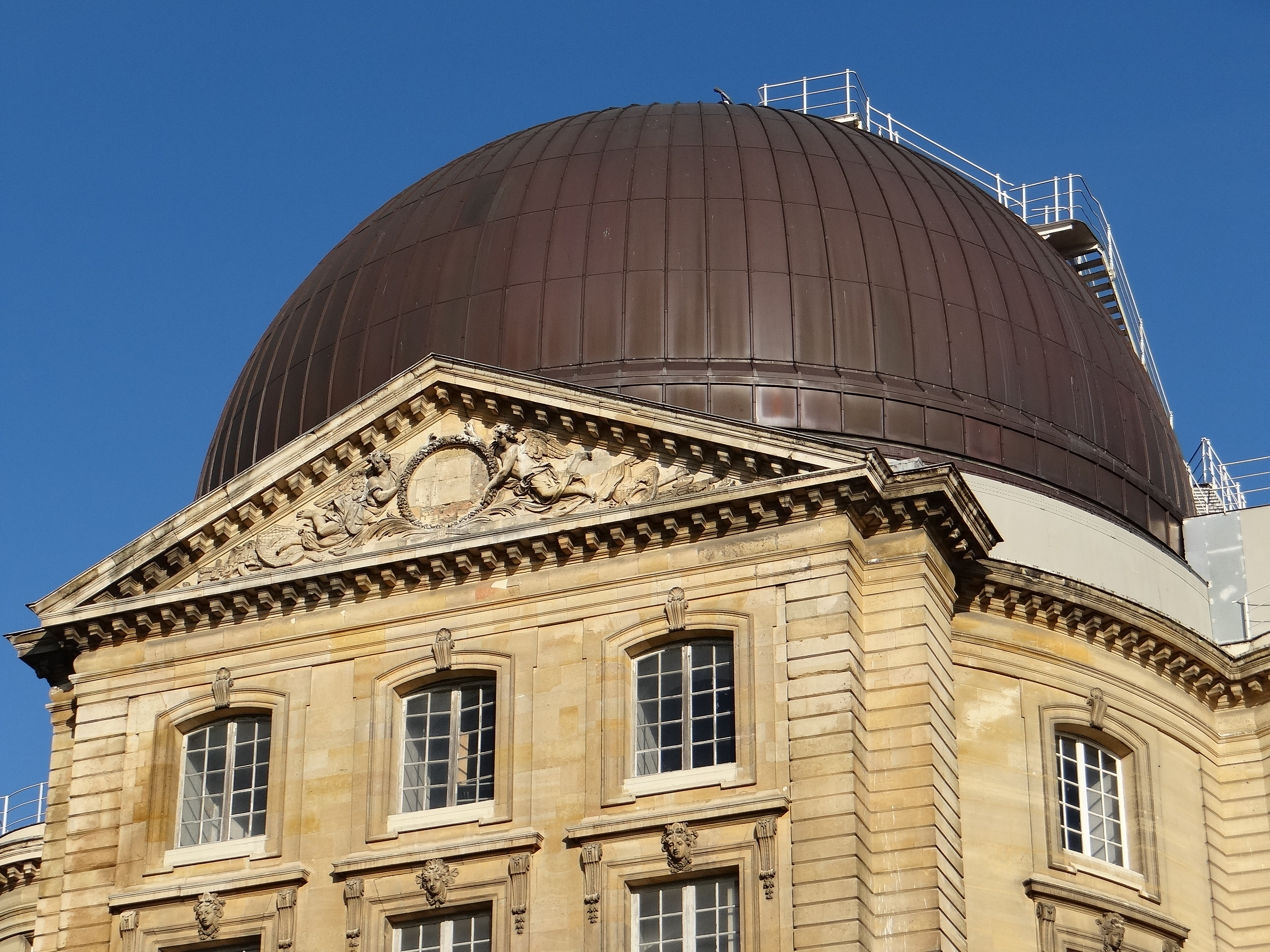
Dome of the Great refractor of Meudon

Meudon Observatory was founded in 1876, but became part of the Paris Observatory in the 1926. In this period the observatories were not just a telescope, but more like a laboratory, with integrated equipment, libraries, and workshops for practical and theoretical astronomy. A major focus was developing new kinds of instruments.

The chief developer was Pierre Janssen, who orchestrated the construction of the large refractor. Janssen was famous for his role in the discovery of Helium in 1868, and by 1875 he was authorized to build a large astrophysical observatory.

The facilities were built on the ruins of an old French palace, noted in the publication Scientific American for "beautiful view of Paris and the river seine." As one era ended a new one started, with the foundations of the telescopes built on the ruins, and old stables converted into laboratories.

The dome building took about ten years of construction from 1880 to 1890. The site has a long history going back to a summer palace designed by Le Primatic, then a summer Palace of the Grand Dauphin by the end of the 17th century; some expansion were done by Jules Hardouin-Mansart. The old château Vieux was replaced by the château Neuf, which was used until the Franco-Prussian War of 1870. The usuefull location meant the sites involvement in the activities of that war, and by the end it was left ruin. On these ruins Janssen was able to use location for the new observatory, that would house the great telescope.

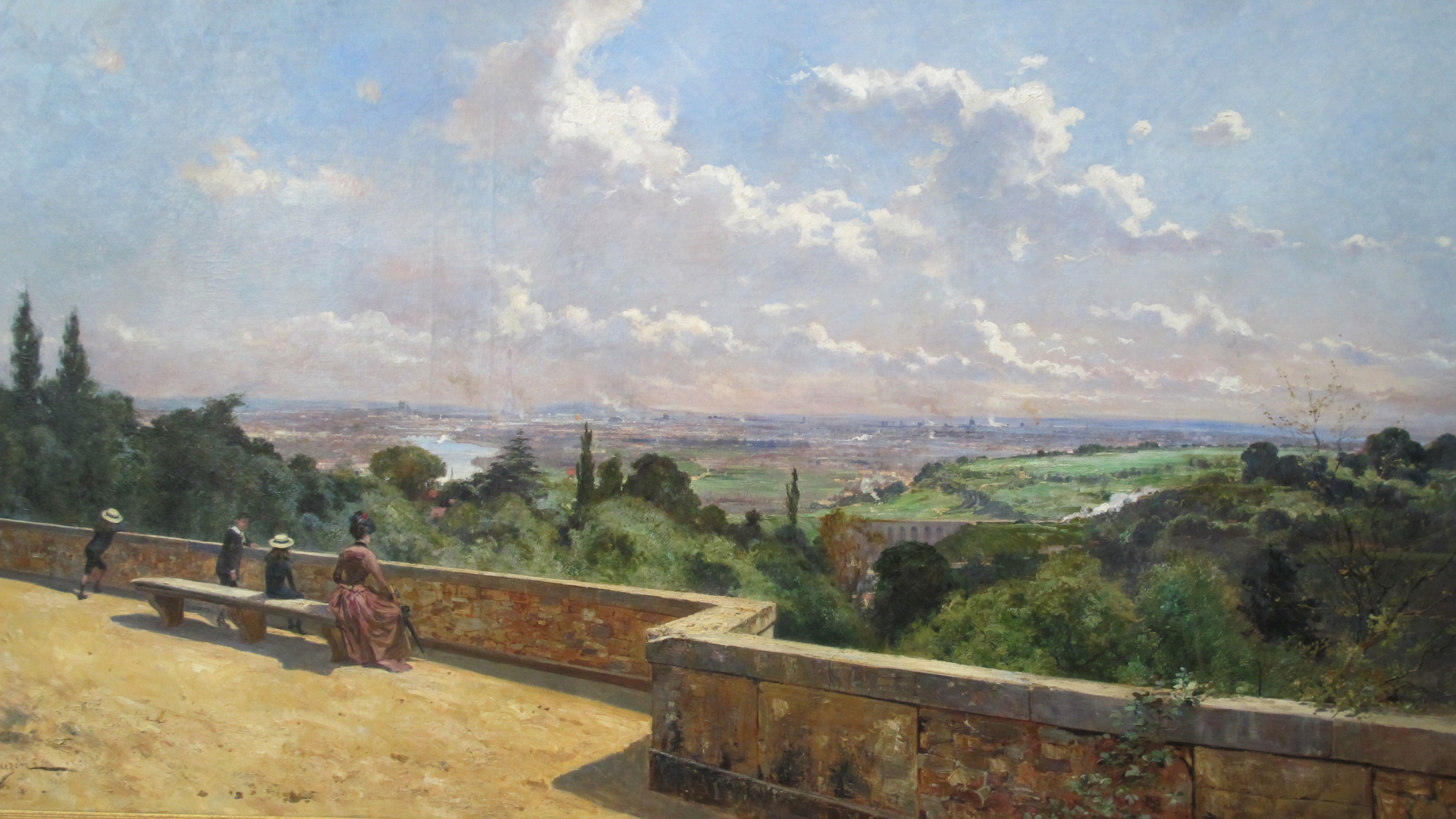
View of river Seine and the city of Paris, 1889 painting (view out from the observatory site)

== Design and construction ==
Aperture (cm)	Aperture (in)	Focal Length (m)	Purpose	Refs
82	32.3	17	Visual	
63	24.8	17	Photographic-blue	

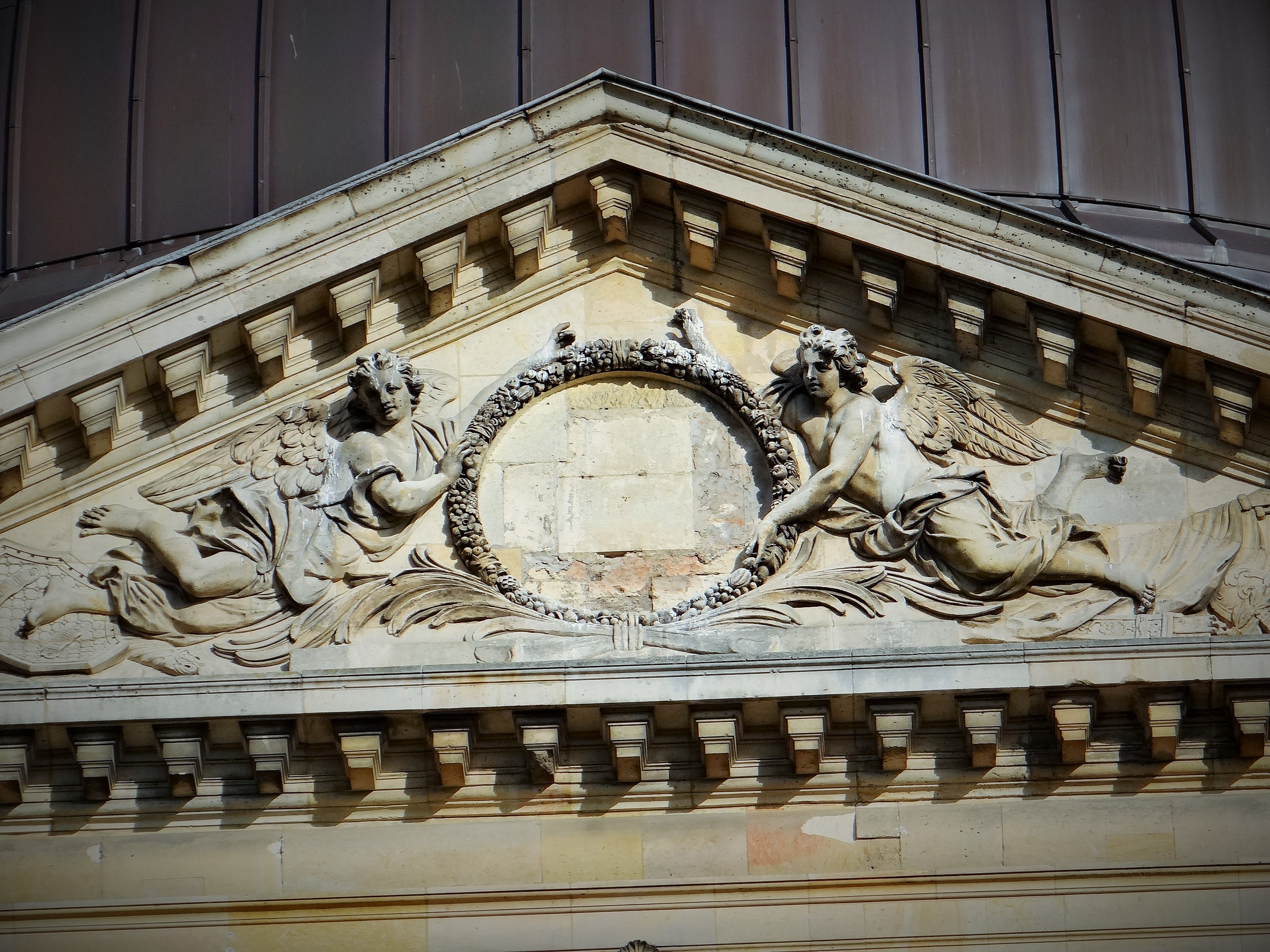
Detail of the pediment below the observatory dome

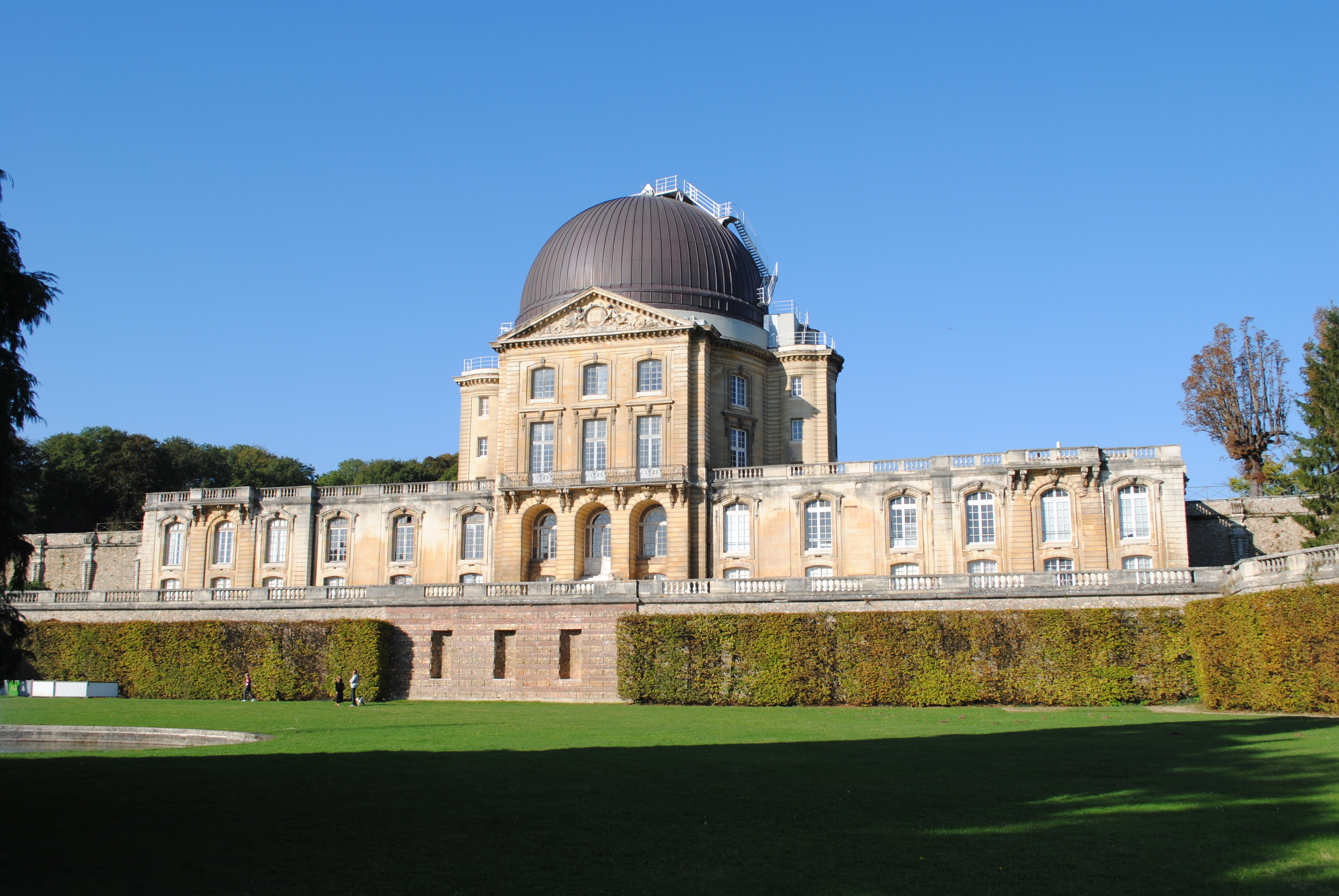
The observatory building with its telescope dome

There are two objective lenses, one is designed for the human eye, and the other for photography. The 62 cm lens is designed to focus blue light, which is the color desired for the film emulsion. (It would be another century before CCD imaging came into force).

The lenses in the telescope are a type of glass lens that has two parts, usually called an achromat. The two parts, called a 'crown' and 'flint' have not only a certain shape (i.e. figure) but also a different chemical composition. The crown glass typically is made with potassium and sodium silicates, while the flint is usually made with potassium and lead silicates.

The 62 cm aperture photographic lens corrected for the colour blue, was not installed until 1898.

The 1886 prices for each lens, was 130 thousand francs for the visual, and 50 thousand francs for the photographic. The dome is made of iron and weighs 100 tons. It was made by the firm Etablissements Cali.

The Meudon refractor resides in Grande Cupola surrounded by the gardens and other site facilities.

The Meudon telescope was typical of this period, missing out on becoming the largest refractor because of the Lick Observatory telescope coming online in 1888, and there were even bigger refractors, such as the Yerkes Observatory telescope, inaugurated in 1897.

With the advent of chemical-based astrophotography in the 19th century, there were some difficulties in adapting Great refactors to this application. There were different solutions, and one way was to make to separate objectives in separate tubes, with each lens having different optical properties. An example of the first case was the Great refractor of Meudon Observatory, which had a visual objective lens of 32.7 (83 cm) inches on one tube, and alongside it another tube with a lens of 24.4 inches (63 cm) intended for photographic work.

The lenses are mounted in the same tube, in this case actually rectangular and is made of steel.

The observatory resides in a special park designed by fr:Urbain Vitry, the Parc de l'Observatoire.

The dome was originally turned by a 12-horsepower gasoline engine, and electrical power was provided to the dome by an 8 hp engine running a generator.

The telescope was noted for an instrument that detected polarization of light, installed in the 1920s by Bernard Lyot.

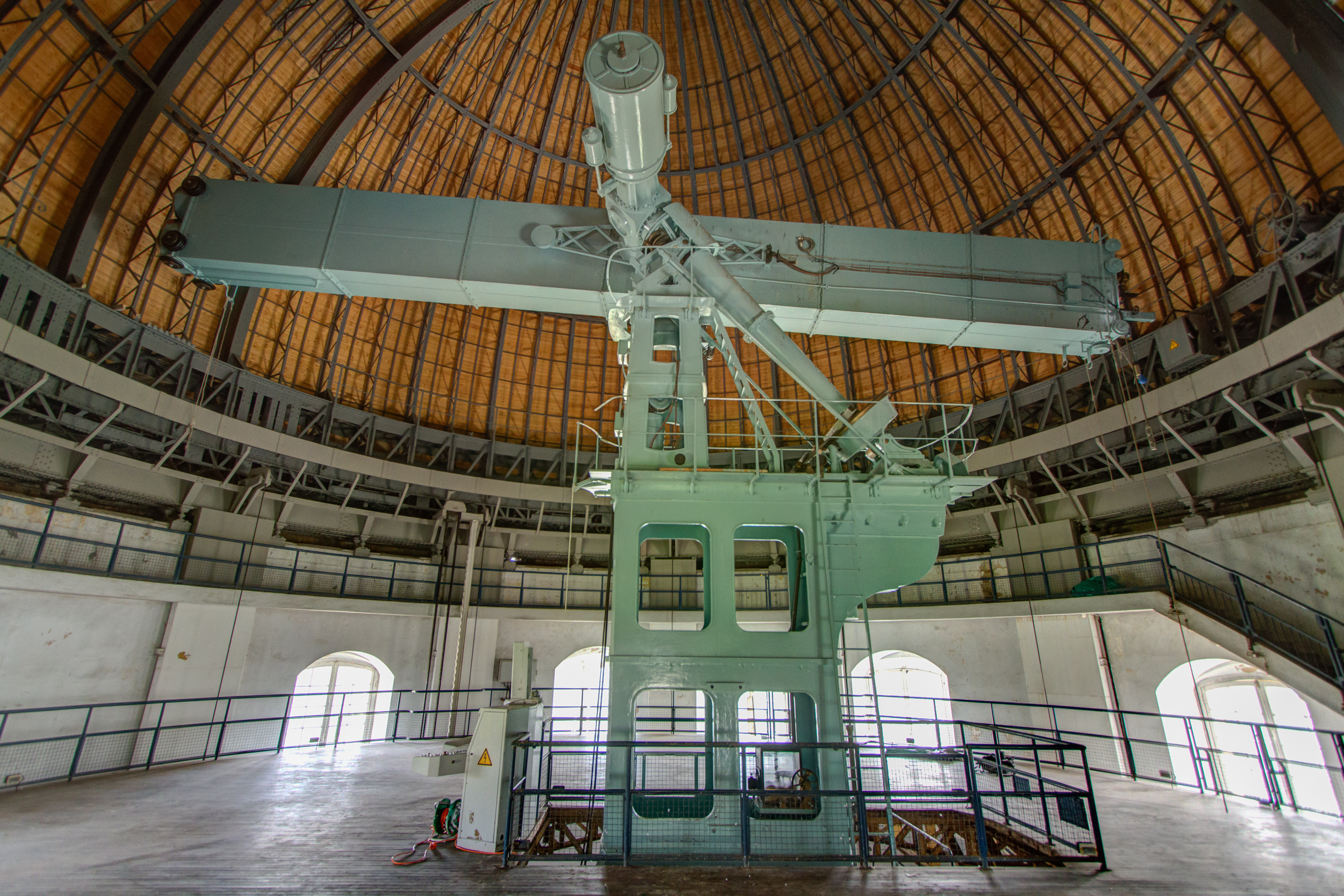
The Grande Lunette of Meudon Observatory (France), was a double refractor with both an 83 cm and 62 cm aperture objective lenses on one shaft, and came online in 1891. (Shown in the year 2015)

== History ==
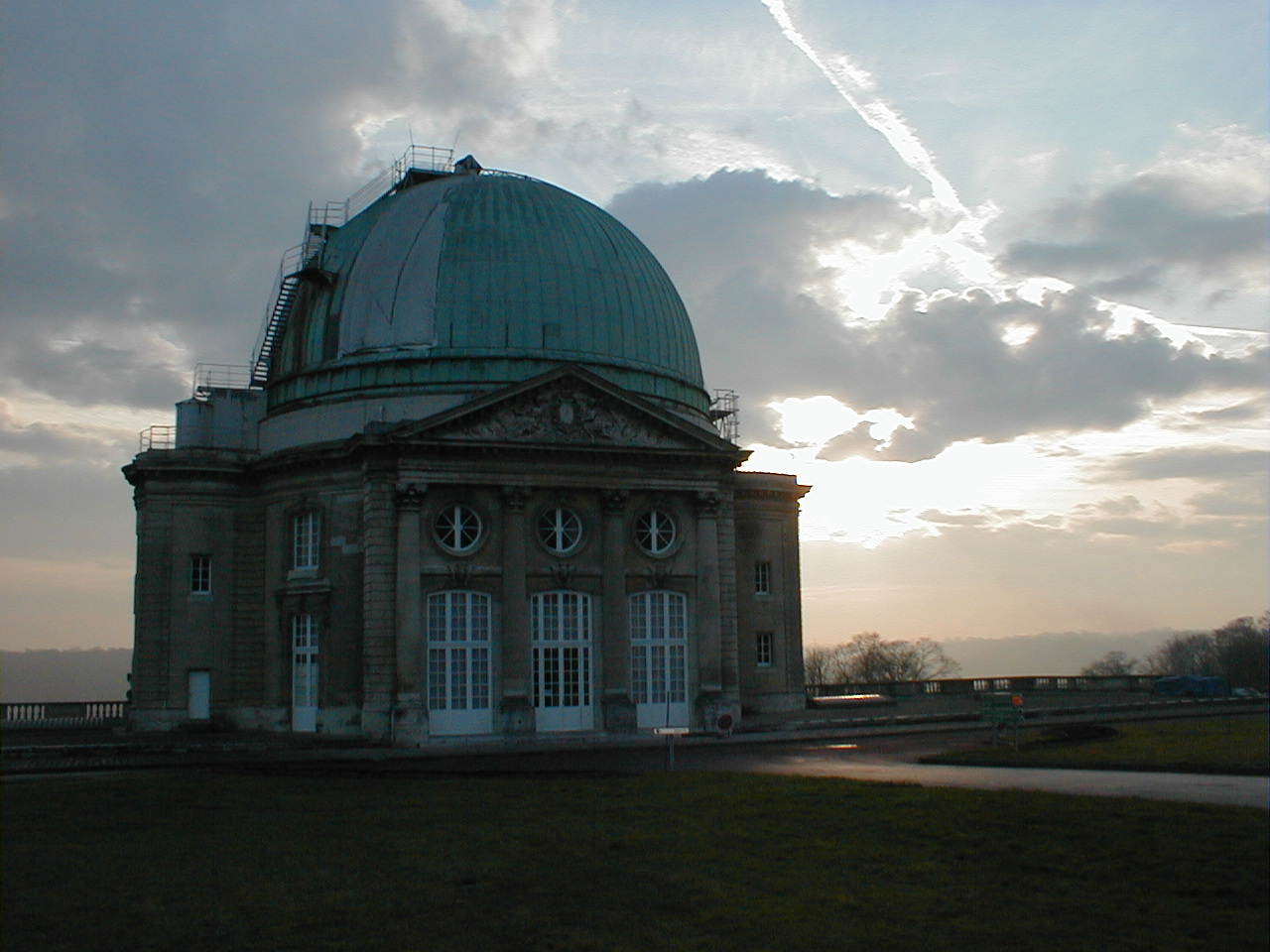
The dome prior to its 21st century rejuvenation

The telescope was established in 1891, and the second lens for photography was installed in 1898. The telescope was used for astronomical research for a century before being idled.

Some famous astronomers of the 20th century that used the telescope include for example, Bernard Lyot and E. M. Antoniadi.

Dr. Janssen made his first observation with the telescope in 1893.

The first observation was of the Pole star, followed by the targets such as the Moon, Jupiter, and Mars.

The dome was damaged by the weather in 1999, but a grant from the French Ministry of Education supported its repair.

== Observations ==
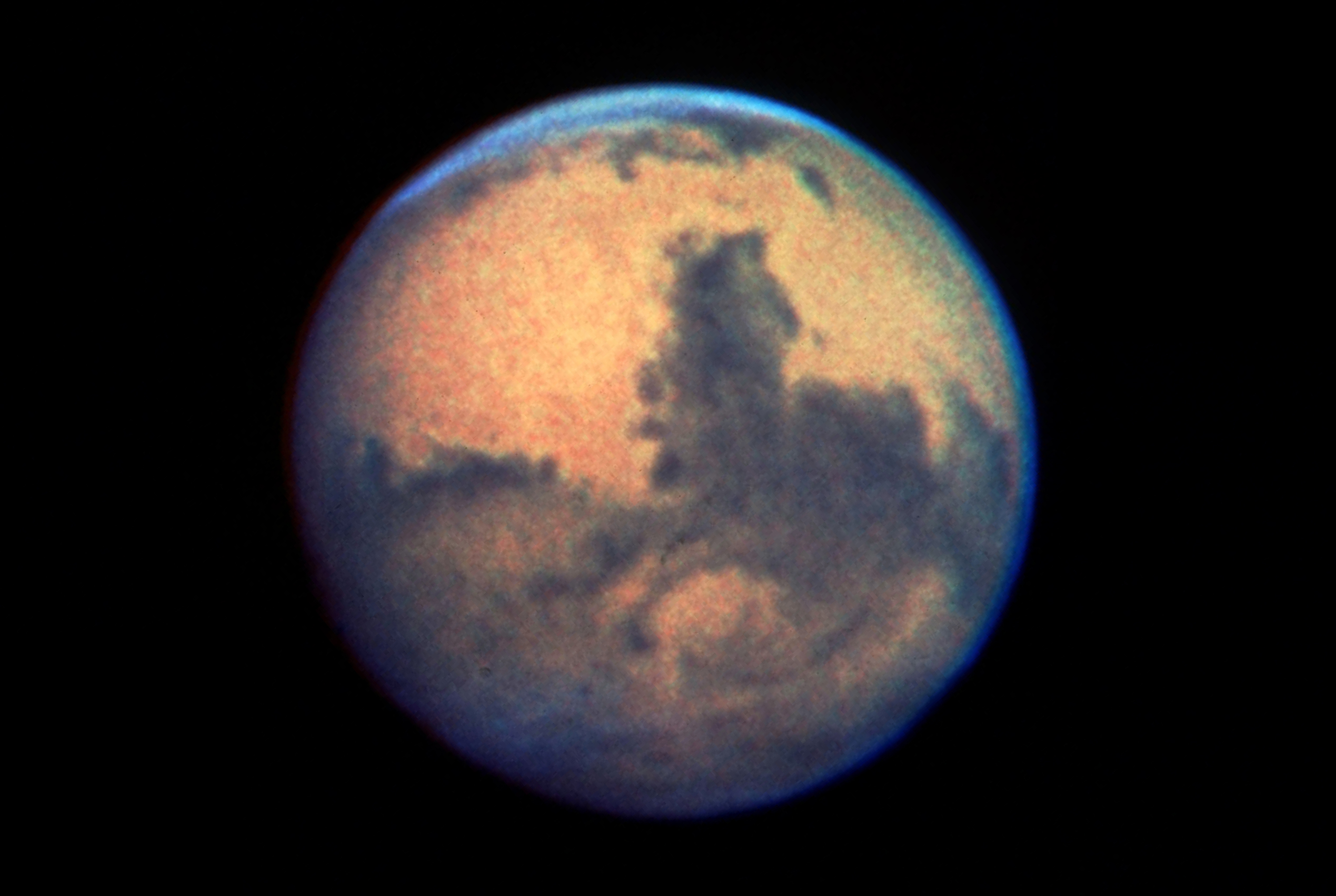
Mars, as seen by the Hubble Space Telescope, 1990

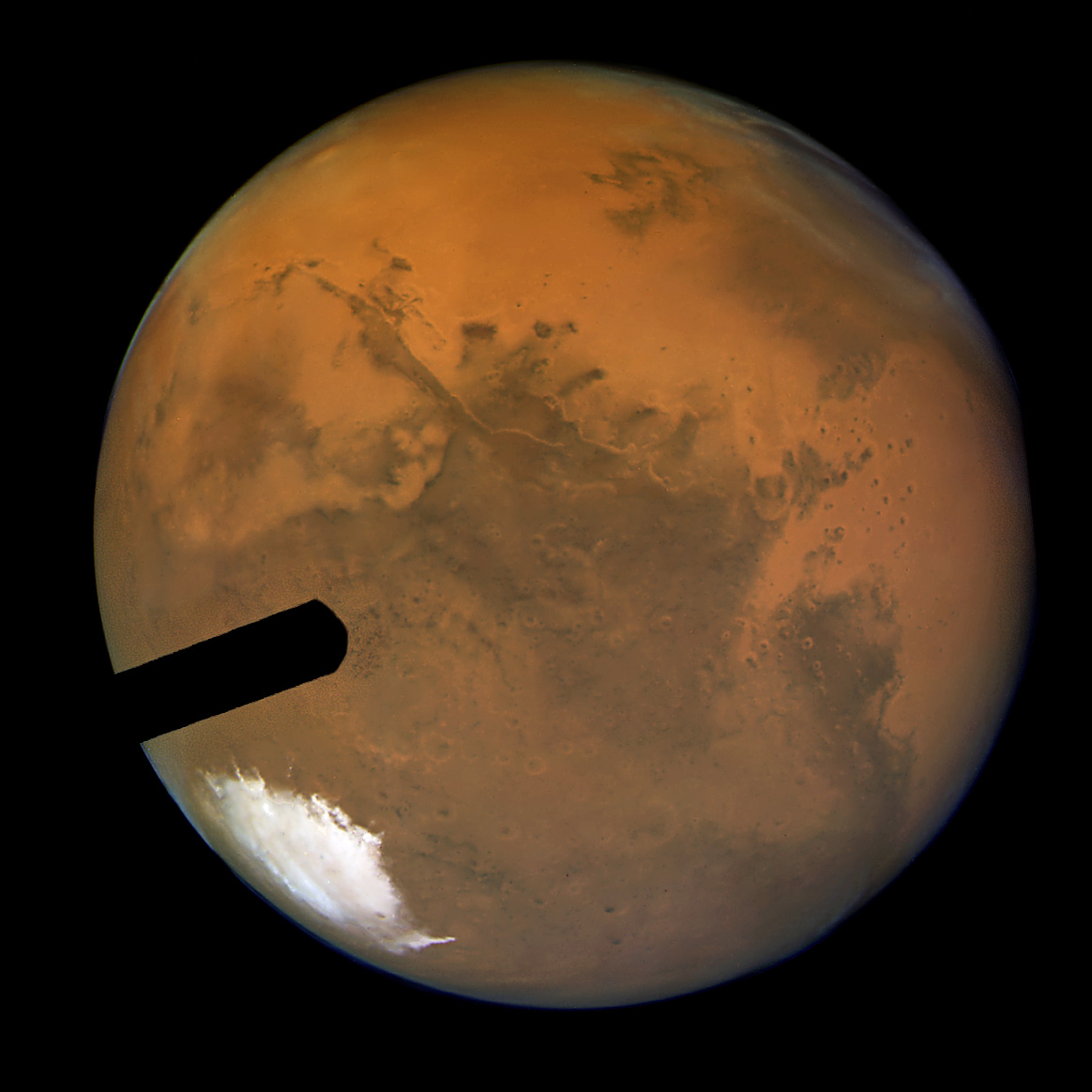
Mars, as seen by the HST with corrected lens, 2003

The telescope was typically used to observe planets, double stars, comets, and asteroids. At the time asteroids are often also called minor planets, and was synonymous with asteroids; the first non-asteroid minor planets (beside the errant comet) was not found until the 1990s. Also the observation of planets meant, planets of the Solar System, as it was, again a century before exoplanet discovery was confirmed.

The telescope had a good reputation among astronomers for an achromatic telescope in the early 20th century.

Dr. Jules Janssen made the first observation with the telescope in 1893, of the pole star. He went on to make observations of the Moon and Mars. By 1896 the astronomer Henri Perrotin used the great refractor to make observations of planet Jupiter.

Starting in 1909 Eugène Antoniadi was able to help disprove the theory of Martian canali by viewing through the great refractor. A trifecta of observational factors synergize; viewing through the third largest refractor in the World, Mars was at opposition, and exceptional clear weather. The canali dissolved before Antoniadi's eyes into various "spots and blotches" on the surface of Mars.

The spider webs of Mars are doomed to become a myth of the past

— Antoniadi, 1909.

Antoniadi's use of the Meudon refractor (often called the 33 inch) added to a growing body of evidence from astronomer's around the world using large telescopes that were not seeing the canals of Mars. There was a counter-theory that small telescopes, in which the canals could sometimes be seen, were somehow better than larger telescopes, in which the canals could not. This idea also crumbled, as larger telescopes being used by experienced astronomers under the best conditions available were not seeing any canals, but rather finer details of the Martian surface and atmosphere.

In addition, a telescope at Pic Du Midi was used to take over 1300 pictures of Mars, and among them "no trace" of canals could be seen. It was rebutted that the canals were due to differing observing (i.e. "seeing") conditions. Combined with reports from America, by the astronomers George Ellery Hale and Edward Emerson Barnard, Antoniadi could not find support for geometric canals, and felt that improvements in photography would support this.

In the 1920s, Antoniadi also made observations of the rotation period of the planet Mercury. The planet was reported as appearing as "yellow orange with tinge of copper", with some grey areas as well.

In the early 20th century, the Meudon refractor was noted for being very steady, and this aided in taking micrometer measurements of the Galilean moons of Jupiter. In addition, the surfaces of these bodies were sketched and attempts made to determine their rotation period.

In 1954, a ruined ring plain inside the Lunar crater Godin was discovered with the Meudon 83 cm refractor visually. It is noted as a difficult visual observation target from Earth, and it lies west of the crater peak.

== Site ==
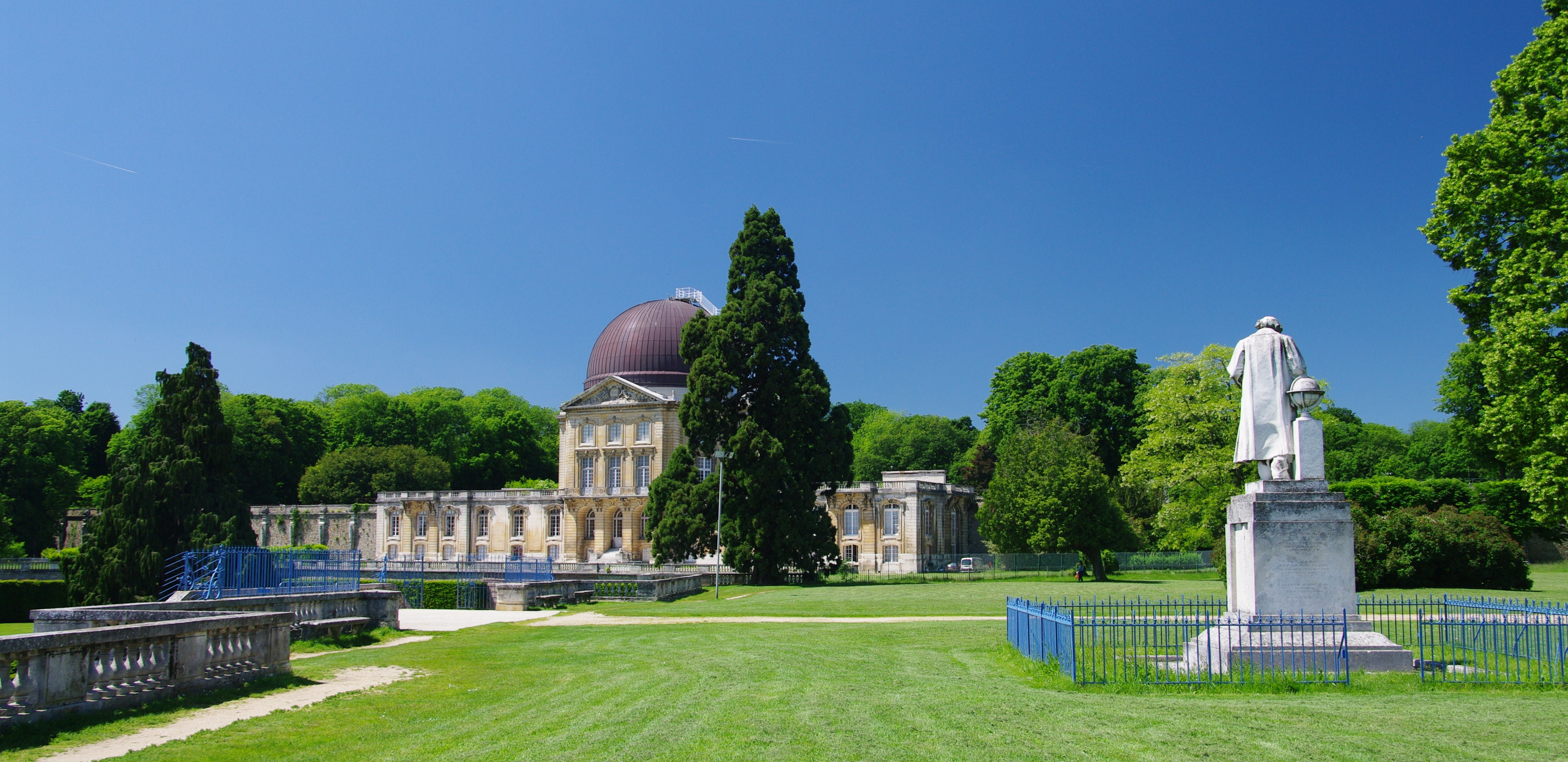
Panorama of the refractor dome and surrounding gardens

== See also ==
- List of largest optical telescopes of the 19th century
- Lists of telescopes
