= List of New Testament minuscules (2101–2200) =

A New Testament minuscule is a copy of a portion of the New Testament written in a small, cursive Greek script (developed from Uncial).

== Legend ==
- The numbers (#) are the now standard system of Caspar René Gregory, often referred to as the Gregory-Aland numbers.
- Included among the cataloged minuscules are the following types of manuscripts, color coded:

Grey represents continuous text manuscripts containing only New Testament portions
Beige represents manuscripts with New Testament portions and a catena (quotations from church fathers)
Light cyan represents manuscripts of single-author commentaries who included the full Scripture text.
Light red represents manuscripts of single-author commentaries who included both the full Scripture text and a catena.
Light purple represents manuscripts of commentaries where the Scripture text was abridged.
White represents manuscript numbers no longer in use.

- Dates are estimated to the nearest 100 year increment where specific date is unknown.
- Content generally only describes sections of the New Testament: Gospels, The Acts of the Apostles (Acts), Pauline epistles, and so on. Sometimes the surviving portion of a codex is so limited that specific books, chapters or even verses can be indicated. Linked articles, where they exist, generally specify content in detail, by verse.
- Digital images are referenced with direct links to the hosting web pages, with the exception of those at the INTF. The quality and accessibility of the images is as follows:

Gold color indicates high resolution color images available online.
Tan color indicates high resolution color images available locally, not online.
Light tan color indicates only a small fraction of manuscript pages with color images available online.
Light gray color indicates black/white or microfilm images available online.
Light blue color indicates manuscript not imaged, and is currently lost or ownership unknown.
Light pink color indicates manuscript destroyed, presumed destroyed, or deemed too fragile to digitize.
Violet color indicates high resolution ultraviolet images available online.

† Indicates the manuscript has damaged or missing pages.
^{P} Indicates only a portion of the books were included.
^{K} Indicates manuscript also includes a commentary.
^{S} Indicates lost portions of manuscript replaced via supplement of a later hand.
^{abs} (abschrift) Indicates manuscript is copy.
[ ] Brackets around Gregory-Aland number indicate the manuscript belongs to an already numbered manuscript, was found to not be a continuous text manuscript, was found to be written in modern Greek versus Koine Greek, was proved a forgery, or has been destroyed.

== Minuscules 2101–2200 ==
#	Date	Contents	Pages	Institution and refs.	City, State	Country	Images
2101	13th	Zigabenus Commentary on the Gospels	269	Bodleian Library, MS. Barocci 28	Oxford	United Kingdom	DB
2102	15th	Theophylact Commentary on the Pauline Epistles	401	Bodleian Library, MS. Barocci 146, fol. 1-401	Oxford	United Kingdom	DB
2102	15th	Theophylact Commentary on the Pauline Epistles	401	Bodleian Library, MS. Barocci 146, fol. 1-401	Oxford	United Kingdom	INTF
2103	12th	Gospel of John^{P}	94	Bodleian Library, MS. Barocci 225	Oxford	United Kingdom	DB
2104	12th	Theophylact Commentary on the Pauline Epistles†	291	Bodleian Library, MS. E. D. Clarke 42	Oxford	United Kingdom	INTF
2105	14th	Theophylact Commentary on the Pauline Epistles	235	Bodleian Library, MS. Auct. E. 1. 6	Oxford	United Kingdom	INTF
2106	12th	Theophylact Commentary on Mark, John	293	Bodleian Library, Auct. T. 2. 1	Oxford	United Kingdom	INTF
2107	13th	Theophylact Commentary on the Gospels	238	Bodleian Library, MS. Cromwell 17	Oxford	United Kingdom	INTF
2108	12th-13th	Gospels †	1	University of Birmingham Cadbury Research Library, Braithwaite 5	Birmingham	United Kingdom	INTF
2108	12th-13th	Gospels †	226	Lincoln College, Gr. 38	Oxford	United Kingdom	INTF
2109	14th	Zigabenus Commentary on the Gospels	361	St. John's College, MS 44	Oxford	United Kingdom	INTF
2110	10th	Pauline Epistles	183	National Library, Grec 702, fol. 252-434	Paris	France	BnF, INTF
2111	13th	Gospel of Luke^{P}	12	National Library, Supplement Grec 1248, fol. 12-23	Paris	France	BnF
2111	13th	Gospel of Luke^{P}	12	National Library, Supplement Grec 1248, fol. 12-23	Paris	France	INTF
2112	13th	Gospels	266	National Library, Supplement Grec 1282	Paris	France	BnF, INTF
2113	12th	Gospels^{P}†	>1	Zoodochos Pigi Monastery (Hagias), 30, fol. 17.22	Andros	Greece	INTF
2114	17th	Maximus Peloponnesius Commentary on Revelation	115	National Library, 141	Athens	Greece	CSNTM
2114	17th	Maximus Peloponnesius Commentary on Revelation	115	National Library, 141	Athens	Greece	INTF
2115	12th	Acts of the Apostles & Pauline Epistles	232	(Lost, formerly Athens, G. Burnias)			
2116	1687	Revelation	?	(Lost, formerly Athens, G. Burnias)			
2117	12th	Gospels	259	Byzantine and Christian Museum, 2	Athens	Greece	INTF
2118	13th	Gospels	360	Byzantine and Christian Museum, 1	Athens	Greece	INTF
2119	13th	Matthew† 12:10-26:43; Mark† 1:1-5:21, 14:43-16:20	92	National Historical Museum, 212	Athens	Greece	CSNTM, INTF
2120	12th	Gospels	263	Athens University History Museum, 18	Athens	Greece	MOTB
2120	12th	Gospels	263	Athens University History Museum, 18	Athens	Greece	INTF
2121+[2443]	11th	Matthew†, Mark†, Luke, John†	179	Athens University History Museum, AK 23	Athens	Greece	CSNTM
2121+[2443]	11th	Matthew†, Mark†, Luke, John†	179	Athens University History Museum, AK 23	Athens	Greece	AU
2122	12th	Gospels	281	Athens University History Museum, 2	Athens	Greece	AU
2122	12th	Gospels	281	Athens University History Museum, 2	Athens	Greece	INTF
2123	13th	Matthew, Mark, Luke†	163	Athens University History Museum, AK 24	Athens	Greece	CSNTM, INTF
2124	14th	Gospels^{P}	2	Athens University History Museum, 36	Athens	Greece	AU
2125	10th	General Epistles† and Pauline Epistles†	270	Estense Library, G. 196, a.V.6.3 (II G 3), fol. 52-321	Modena	Italy	INTF
2126	12th	Gospels	203	Victor Emmanuel III National Library, Ms. II. A. 38	Naples	Italy	INTF
2127	12th	Gospels†, Acts, General Epistles, Pauline Epistles	1	Free Library, Lewis E M 044: 27-28	Philadelphia, PA	USA	FL
2127	12th	Gospels†, Acts, General Epistles, Pauline Epistles	229	Central Library, Dep. Mus. 4	Palermo	Italy	INTF
2128	14th-16th	Homilies on 2 Corinthians, Galatians† (No continuous text)	480	Marciana National Library, Gr. I,35 (1071)	Venice	Italy	INTF
2129	15th	Cyril Commentary on Gospel of John†	382	Marciana National Library, Gr. Z. 121 (324)	Venice	Italy	INTF
2130	16th	James - 3 John	79	Marciana National Library, Gr. I,63 (968)	Venice	Italy	INTF
2131	15th	Gospels, Acts, Pauline Epistles, General Epistles	322	The Vernadsky National Library of Ukraine, F. 301 (KDA), 10p	Kyiv	Ukraine	INTF
2132	11th	Gospels†	20	Russian State Library, F.181.12 (Gr. 12)	Moscow	Russia	INTF
2132	11th	Gospels†	259	National Library of Russia, Gr. 801	Saint Petersburg	Russia	INTF
2133	11th	Gospels	463	Russian State Library, F.201.19 (Gr. 8)	Moscow	Russia	INTF
2134	11th	Gospels	340	State Historical Museum, V. 13, S. 518	Moscow	Russia	
2135	12th	Gospels	317	State Historical Museum, V. 14, S. 519	Moscow	Russia	INTF
2136	17th	New Testament	479	State Historical Museum, V. 26, S. 472	Moscow	Russia	INTF
2137	17th	Gospels†, Acts†, General Epistles†	190	State Historical Museum, V. 27, S. 473	Moscow	Russia	INTF
2138	1072	Acts, General Epistles†, Pauline Epistles†, Revelation	398	Scientific Library of the State Gorky University, 2 (Gorkij-Bibl. 2280)	Moscow	Russia	INTF
2139	13th	Gospels †	257	National Library of Russia, Gr. 184	Saint Petersburg	Russia	INTF
2140	12th	Gospels †	180	National Library of Russia, Gr. 204	Saint Petersburg	Russia	INTF
2141	12th-13th	Gospels	286	National Library of Russia, Gr. 206	Saint Petersburg	Russia	INTF
2142	10th-11th	Gospels	285	National Library of Russia, Gr. 210	Saint Petersburg	Russia	INTF
2143	12th	Acts, Pauline Epistles, General Epistles	241	National Library of Russia, Gr. 211	Saint Petersburg	Russia	INTF
2144	11th	Matthew†, Mark†, Luke†	139	National Library of Russia, Gr. 221	Saint Petersburg	Russia	INTF
2145	12th	Gospels †	331	National Library of Russia, Gr. 222	Saint Petersburg	Russia	INTF
2146	12th	Gospels	359	National Library of Russia, Gr. 223	Saint Petersburg	Russia	INTF
2147	11th-12th	Gospels†, Acts†, Pauline Epistles†, General Epistles†	291	National Library of Russia, Gr. 224	Saint Petersburg	Russia	INTF
2148	14th	Theophylact Commentary on the Gospels	284	National Library of Russia, Gr. 235	Saint Petersburg	Russia	INTF
[2149]=566							
[2150]=1346							
[2151] = ℓ 1019							
[2152]=609							
[2153] = 1209							
[2154]=1338							
[2155] = 1334							
[2156]=925							
[2157] = 1329							
[2158] = 1206							
2159	1281	Gospels	108	The Russian National Library Academy of Science, K'pel 76	Saint Petersburg	Russia	INTF
2159	1281	Gospels	1	National Library of Russia, Gr. 311	Saint Petersburg	Russia	INTF
2160	1303	Gospels †	2	National Library of Russia, Gr. 314	Saint Petersburg	Russia	
[2161]=938							
[2162] = 1891							
[2163] = 1352							
[2164]=712							
[2165]=928							
[2166] = 951							
[2167] = 1238							
[2168]=903							
[2169]=1348							
[2170]=1336							
[2171]							
2172	10th-11th	Gospels †	195	National Library of Russia, Gr. 509	Saint Petersburg	Russia	INTF
2173	12th	Gospels	234	National Library of Russia, Gr. 511	Saint Petersburg	Russia	INTF
2174	13th	Gospels	250	National Library of Russia, Gr. 513	Saint Petersburg	Russia	INTF
2175	14th	Gospels, Acts, 1 Corinthians-Hebrews †	216	National Library of Russia, Gr. 517	Saint Petersburg	Russia	INTF
2176	11th	Gospels	239	National Library of Russia, Gr. 538	Saint Petersburg	Russia	INTF
2177	12th	Gospels †	153	National Library of Russia, Gr. 539	Saint Petersburg	Russia	INTF
2178	14th-15th	Gospels	279	National Library of Russia, Gr. 540	Saint Petersburg	Russia	INTF
2179	12th-13th	John †	8	National Library of Russia, Gr. 541	Saint Petersburg	Russia	INTF
2180	13th-14th	Acts, General Epistles, Pauline Epistles †	153	National Library of Russia, Gr. 543	Saint Petersburg	Russia	INTF
2181	1054	Gospels	252	National Library of Russia, Gr. 643	Saint Petersburg	Russia	INTF
2182	12th-13th	Gospels †	319	National Library of Russia, Gr. 644	Saint Petersburg	Russia	INTF
2183	11th	Pauline Epistles	474	Vatopedi Monastery, 239	Mount Athos	Greece	INTF
2184	13th	Theophylact Commentary on Luke, John†	102	Vatopedi Monastery, 251	Mount Athos	Greece	INTF
2185	15th	Theophylact Commentary on Luke, John†	191	Vatopedi Monastery, 252	Mount Athos	Greece	INTF
2186	12th	Chrysostom Commentary on General Epistles† Revelation	94	Vatopedi Monastery, 333, fol. 83-176	Mount Athos	Greece	INTF
2187	13th	Luke† (Nicetas Catena)	585	Vatopedi Monastery, 530	Mount Athos	Greece	INTF
2188	14th	Theophylact Commentary on the Gospels†	264	Vatopedi Monastery, 529	Mount Athos	Greece	INTF
2189	12th	Pauline Epistles	258	Vatopedi Monastery, 593	Mount Athos	Greece	INTF
2190	12th	Matthew†	362	Vatopedi Monastery, 2443	Mount Athos	Greece	INTF
2191	11th	Gospels, Acts, Pauline Epistles, General Epistles	241	Vatopedi Monastery, Ms. W. 530c	Mount Athos	Greece	INTF
2191	11th	Gospels, Acts, Pauline Epistles, General Epistles	1	Walters Art Museum, Ms. W. 530c	Baltimore, MD	USA	WAM
2192	15th	Theophylact Commentary on John†	180	Philotheou Monastery, 85	Mount Athos	Greece	INTF
2193	10th	Gospels	259	Iviron Monastery, 247	Mount Athos	Greece	INTF
2194	1118	Acts, Pauline Epistles, General Epistles	142	Great Lavra Monastery, A' 58	Mount Athos	Greece	INTF
2195	11th	Gospels	352	Vatican Library, Ross.135-138	Vatican City	Vatican City	DVL,
2195	11th	Gospels	352	Vatican Library, Ross.135-138	Vatican City	Vatican City	INTF
2196	16th	Revelation	25	Great Lavra Monastery, I'48, fol. 395-419	Mount Athos	Greece	INTF
2197	14th	Theophylact Commentary on Pauline Epistles†, General Epistles†	411	Vatopedi Monastery, 245	Mount Athos	Greece	INTF
2198	11th	Gospels	217	Owner unknown			
2199	11th	Matthew†, Mark†	49	Monastery of Olympiotissa, 225	Elassona	Greece	INTF
2199	11th	Matthew†, Mark†	42	The Russian National Library Academy of Science, Hist. Inst. 38/669	Saint Petersburg	Russia	INTF
2200	14th	New Testament†	286	Monastery of Olympiotissa, 79	Elassona	Greece	INTF

[top]

== See also ==
- List of New Testament papyri
- List of New Testament uncials
- List of New Testament minuscules (1–1000)
- List of New Testament minuscules (1001–2000)
- List of New Testament minuscules (2001–)
- List of New Testament minuscules ordered by Location/Institution
- List of New Testament lectionaries

== Bibliography ==
- Aland, Kurt; M. Welte; B. Köster; K. Junack (1994). Kurzgefasste Liste der griechischen Handschriften des Neues Testaments. Berlin, New York: Walter de Gruyter. p. 95. ISBN 3-11-011986-2.
- "Liste Handschriften". Münster: Institute for New Testament Textual Research.
