= Stamatios Kleanthis =

Greek architect (1802–1862)

- Σταμάτιος Κλεάνθης
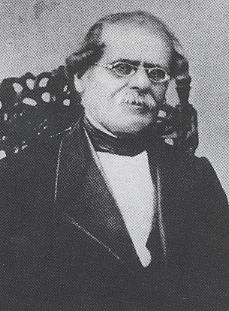
- Born: 1802; Velventos, Kozani, Ottoman Greece (modern-day Greece)
- Died: 1862 (aged 59–60); Athens, Kingdom of Greece (modern-day Greece)
- Occupation: Architect
- Practice: Architecture

Stamatios "Stamatis" Kleanthis (Greek: Σταμάτιος (Σταμάτης) Κλεάνθης; 1802–1862) was a Greek architect.

== Biography ==
Stamatios Kleanthis was born to a Macedonian Greek family in the town of Velventos in Kozani, Macedonia in 1802. As a youth he moved to Bucharest where he studied at the Greek School. On 1821, as member of the Sacred Band, he fought in the insurrection against the Turks led by Alexander Ypsilanti and was captured at the Battle of Dragashani. After escaping, he traveled to Vienna, and then to Leipzig, where he studied architecture. Afterwards he pursued his studies further in Berlin with Karl Friedrich Schinkel.

After graduation, he returned with his colleague and friend Eduard Schaubert to Greece, where they were appointed public engineers by Ioannis Kapodistrias. On 1832 they created a new city plan for Athens, which included wide avenues, gardens and grand public buildings and gave the first street names in Athens. The plan was however simplified by Leo von Klenze, as it was considered too expensive. After disagreements with the administration, Kleanthis resigned his position.

Kleanthis gained great wealth not only through architecture, but also through the marble quarries he operated on the island of Paros. Marble from his quarries received a gold medal at the London Great Exhibition in 1851.

On 1862 he was seriously injured in an accident in a quarry and he was transported to Athens, where he died.

Kleanthis designed many important buildings in Athens, including the Duchess of Plaisance's mansion in Penteli, Rododafni Castle and Villa Ilissia (today the Byzantine & Christian Museum of Athens). The University of Athens was initially accommodated in his house in Plaka, which now houses the Athens University Museum.

== Gallery ==
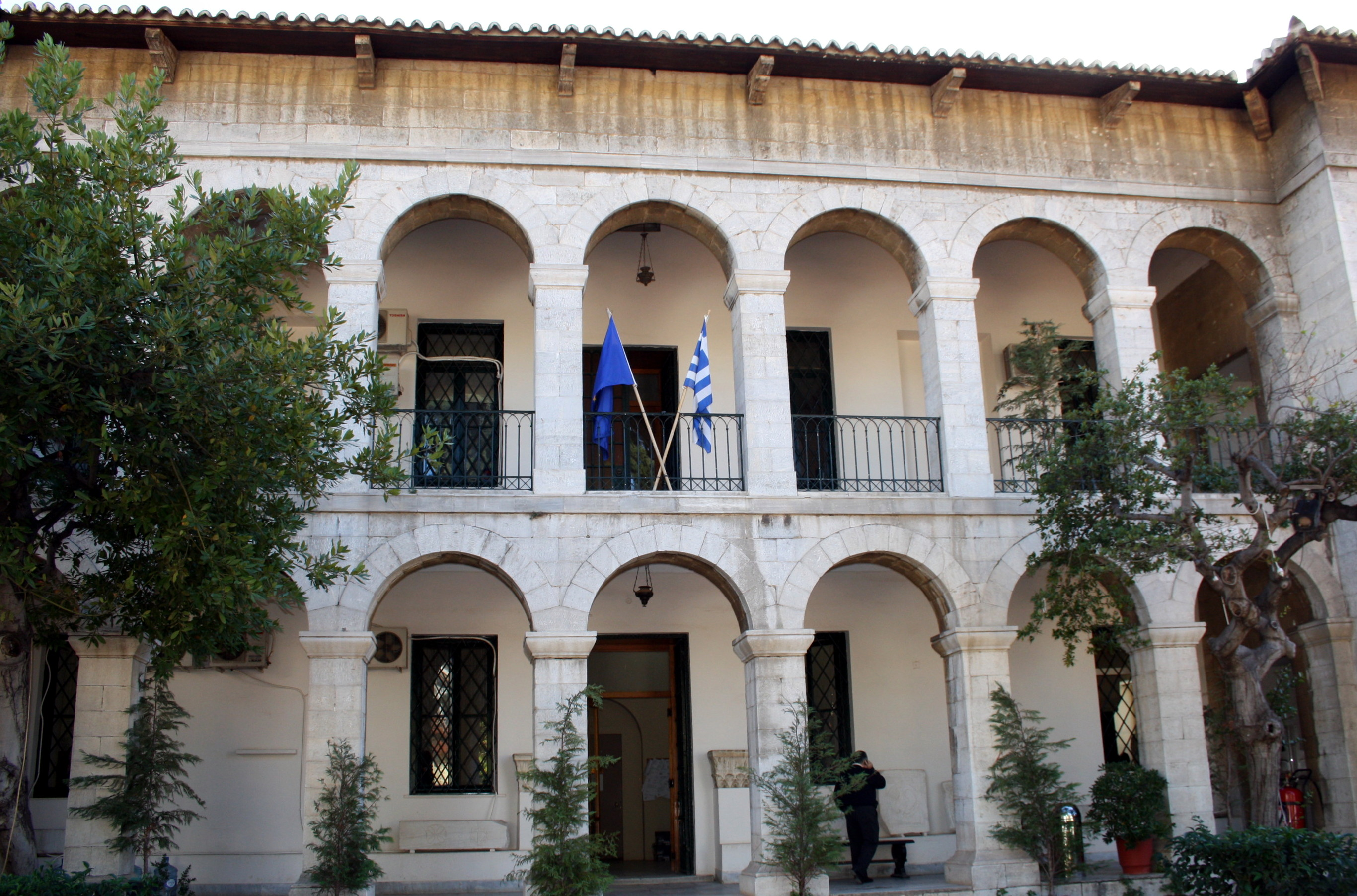
Villa Illision (today the Byzantine & Christian Museum)

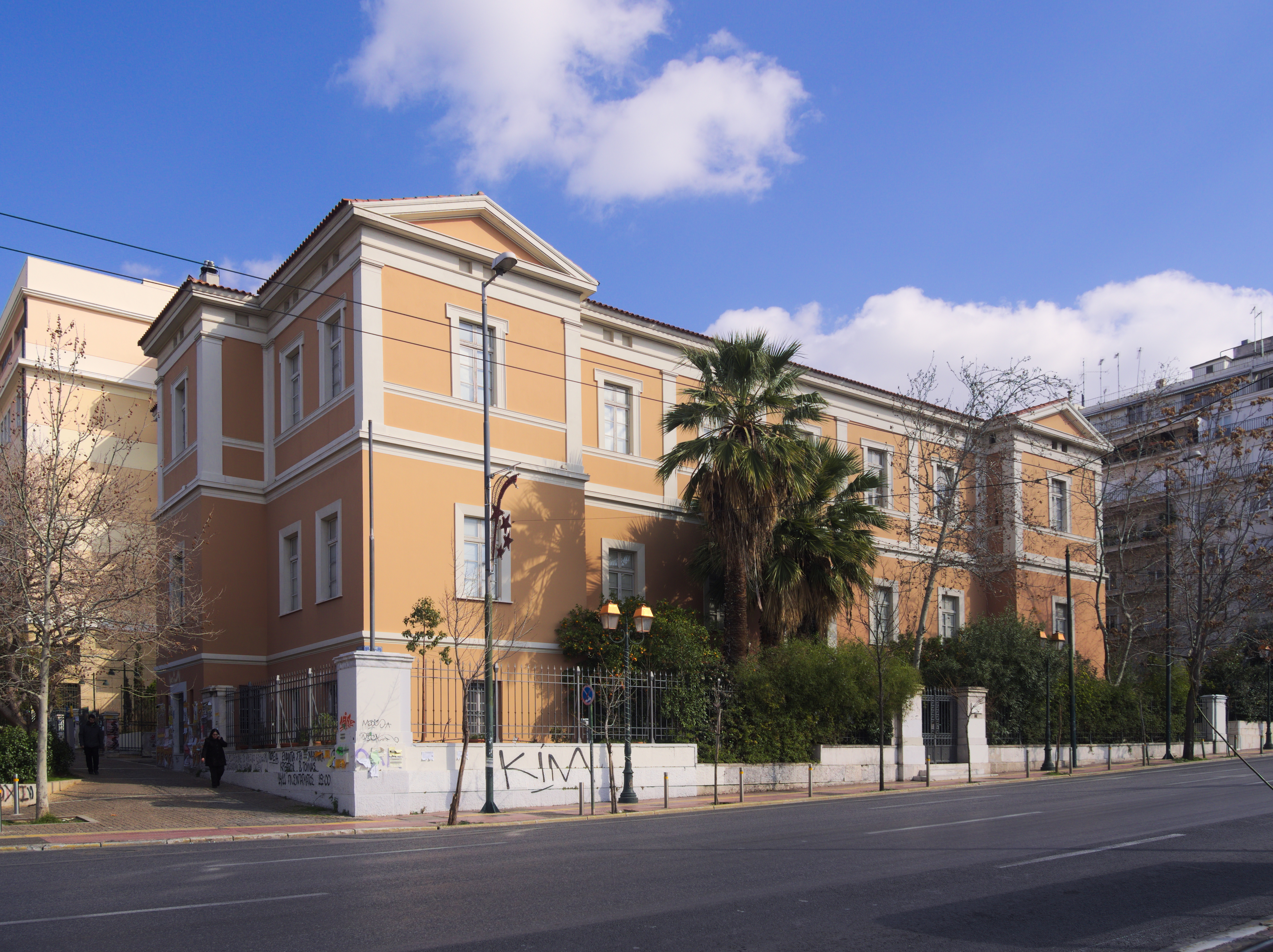
Palamas building, Athens

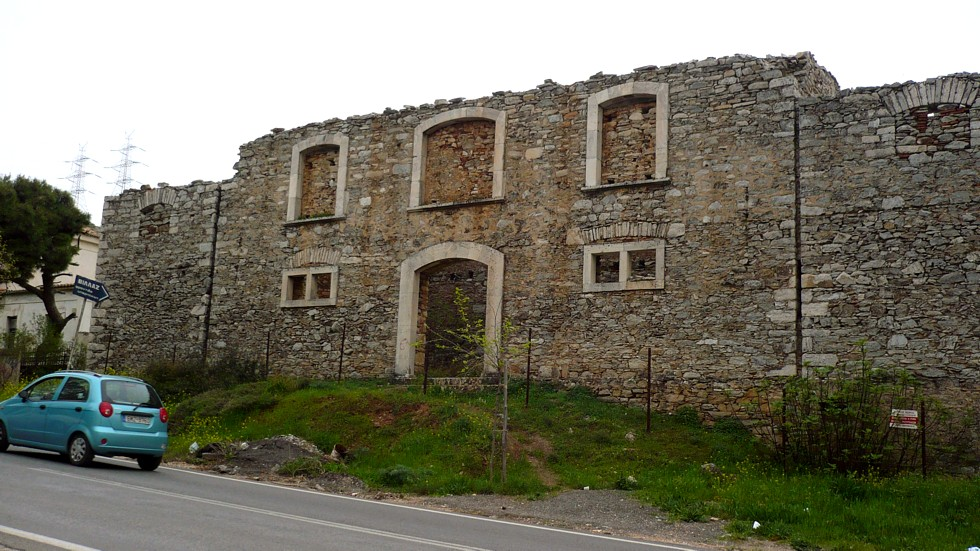
Tourelle for Sophie de Marbois-Lebrun, Duchess of Plaisance in Penteli

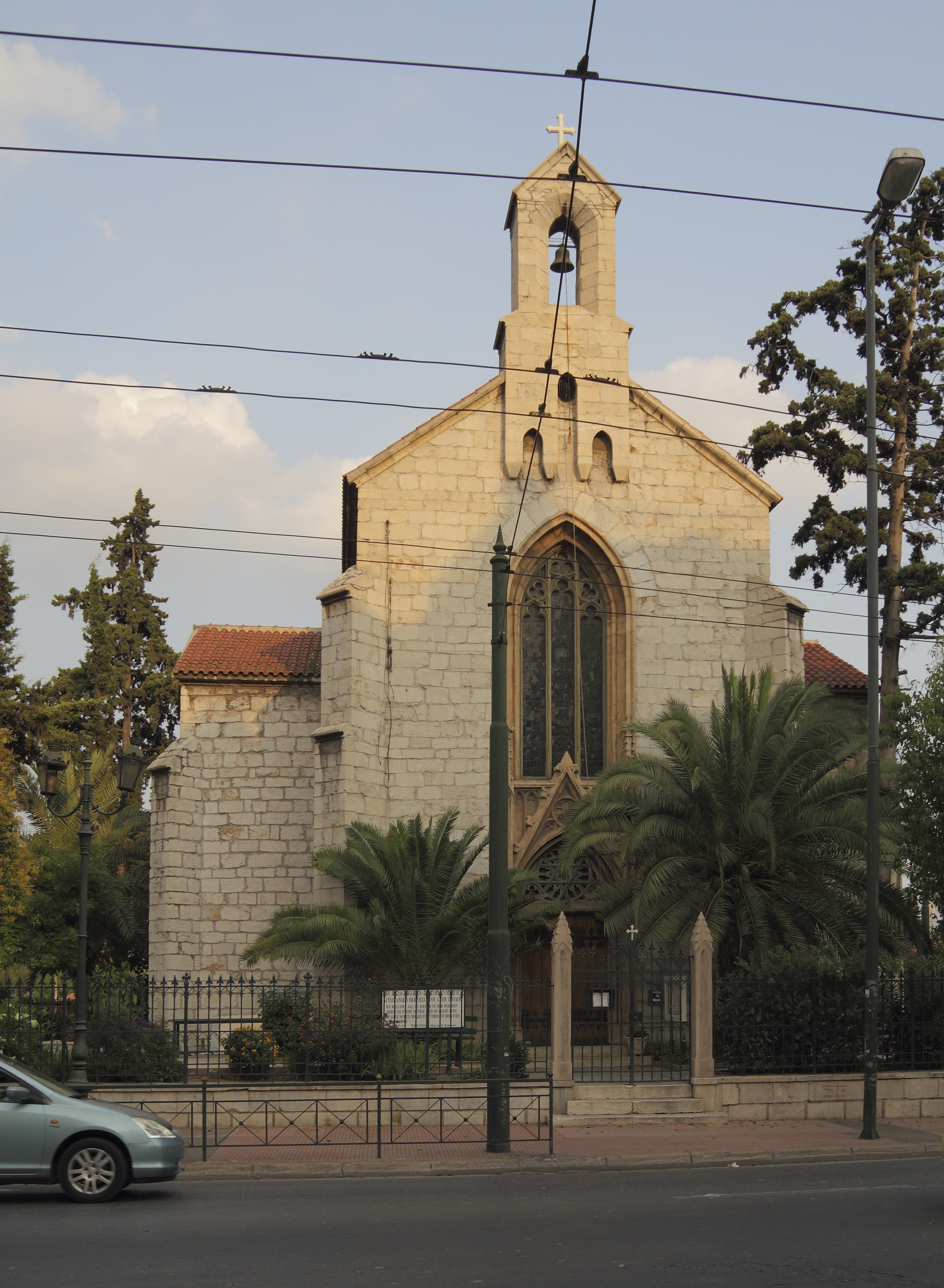
Anglican Church of Saint Paul, Athens

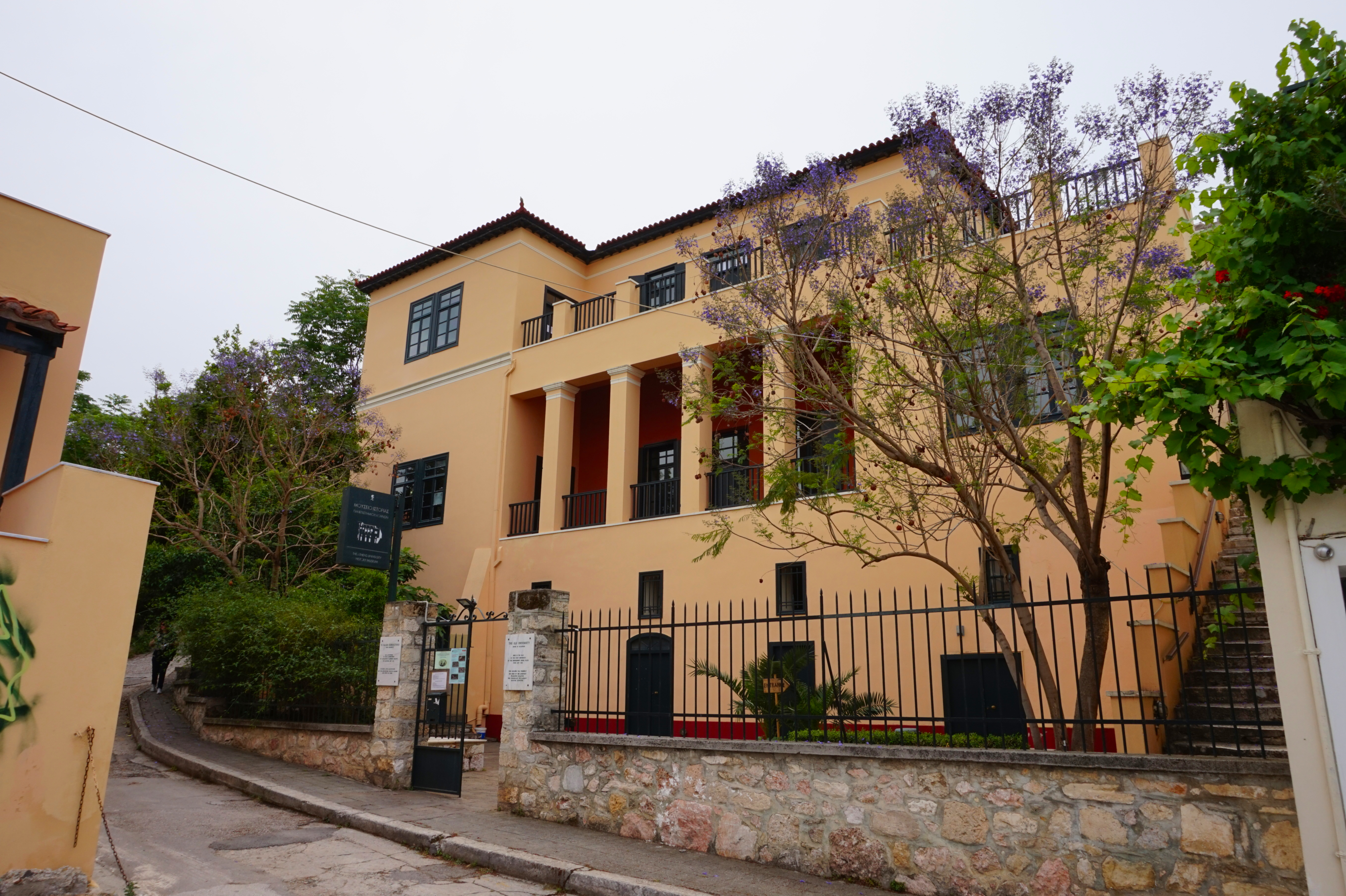
Athens University Museum
