= Eduard Schaubert =

Prussian architect (1804–1860)

Gustav Eduard Schaubert
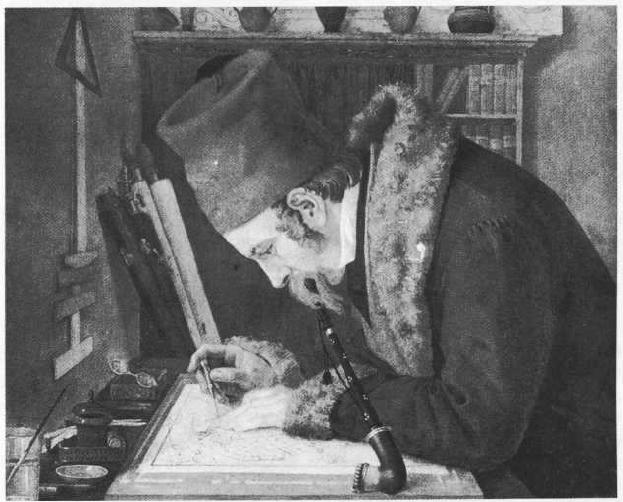
- Born: 27 July 1804; Breslau, Prussia (now Wrocław, Poland)
- Died: 30 March 1860 (aged 55); Breslau, Prussia (now Wrocław, Poland)
- Education: Bauakademie
- Occupation: Architect

Gustav Eduard Schaubert (Greek: Εδουάρδος Σάουμπερτ, romanized: Edouárdos Sáoumpert; 27 July 1804, Breslau, Prussia – 30 March 1860, Breslau) was a Prussian architect, who made a major contribution to the re-planning of Athens after the Greek War of Independence.

== Life ==
=== Urban planner ===
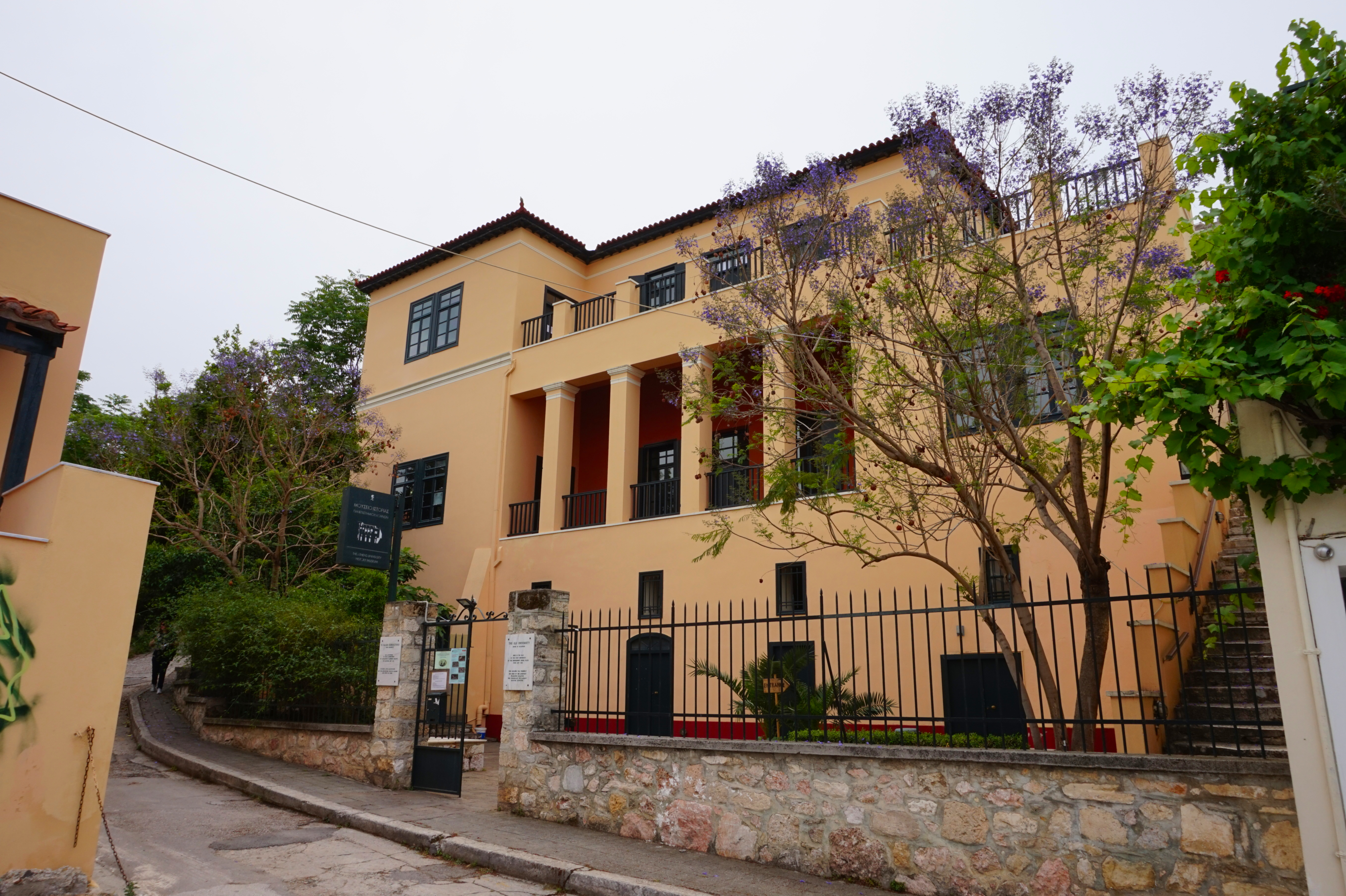
The house of Schaubert and Kleanthis in Plaka, now the Athens University Museum

Schaubert studied in Breslau and at the Bauakademie in Berlin, where he was a pupil of Karl Friedrich Schinkel and studied alongside Stamatios Kleanthis. Schaubert and Kleanthis were among the pioneers of nineteenth century urban redevelopment in Greece. After studying in Berlin they began their architectural careers in Athens under Ioannis Kapodistrias, producing a highly detailed topographical plan of Athens' ancient ruins, Byzantine churches and the buildings of the old city in 1831. This plan became the foundation of the building of a modern capital for the new Kingdom of Greece, expanding it in a triangle to the north of the Acropolis and the Old Town whilst protecting the ancient remains in the northern half of the original city.

This resulted in a neoclassical city with long vistas from the Acropolis and the Church of Panaghia Kapnikarea. It also took ancient remains in other areas into account and combined Otto I of Greece's absolutism (building him a palace) and his philhellenism (reshaping the medieval city and incorporating the classical and Byzantine archaeological sites). Although the plan was modified, such as by Leo von Klenze (1784-1864), architect to Ludwig I of Bavaria, its key points were implemented and it later served as a model for other cities, most notably Piraeus and Eretria.

Schaubert and Kleanthes planned Piraeus together, Schaubert produced the plans for Eretria alone, as a planned city for 10,000 inhabitants. This plan sited the city in an opening through to the bay which functioned as a port, and again protected the archaeological sites in the area. Similar to Athens, he planned north-south axes between a town hall, the agora or marketplace, the church and the Acropolis, but also between the naval school and the library, which were situated on an axis with the ancient theatre.

=== Archaeological digs ===
In 1836 Schaubert and Christian Hansen restored the Temple of Athena Nike on the Acropolis, under the direction of the archaeologist Ludwig Ross. Ross, Schaubert and Hansen published a book on the excavation and re-erection of the structure, making the temple well known among German art historians.

In 1845/1846 Schaubert led the excavation of the so-called Grave of Coroebus, on behalf of Ludwig Ross. Ancient sources named Coroebus as the first-ever victor in the Olympics. His probably fictitious victory was supposed to have occurred in 776 BC, at the first ever Olympic Games. Financed by Frederick William IV of Prussia, the excavations were thus the forerunner of the German excavations at Olympia.

== Works ==
- with Ludwig Ross and Christian Hansen: Die Akropolis von Athen nach den neuesten Ausgrabungen. Abt. I: Der Tempel der Nike Apteros. Berlin 1839.

== Bibliography ==
- Alexander Papageorgiou-Venetas: Eduard Schaubert, Der Städtebauliche Nachlass zur Planung der Städte Athen und Piräus. Bibliopolis 2001, ISBN 978-3-941336-09-4.
- Lehmann, Stephan (2021). "Zu den Anfängen der Klassischen und „vaterländischen" Altertumskunde". In Wiwjorra, Ingo; Hakelberg, Dietrich (eds.). Archäologie und Nation: Kontexte der Erforschung "vaterländischen Alterthums": Zur Geschichte der Archäologie in Deutschland, Österreich und der Schweiz, 1800 bis 1860. Heidelberg: Germanisches Nationalmuseum. pp. 174–187. doi:10.11588/arthistoricum.801.c11981. Archived from the original on 2022-01-28.
- Lehmann, Stephan (2003). "Olympia, das Grab des Koroibos und die Altertumswissenschaften in Halle". In Bertke, Ellen; Kuhn, Heike; Lennartz, Karl (eds.). Olympisch bewegt: Festschrift zum 60. Geburtstag von Prof. Dr. Mannfred Lämmer. Cologne: Die Deutsche Bibliotek. pp. 163–176. ISBN 3883380067.
