= Spanish Master (art forgery hypothesis) =

Suspected art forgery workshop

The Spanish Master, sometimes also called the Spanish Workshop, is a term coined in art history (notname) for a hypothetical designation introduced by the German classical archaeologist Stefan Lehmann to describe a presumed modern forger or group of forgers, responsible for a series of suspected counterfeit ancient bronze sculptures, presumably operating out of Spain. Rather than identifying a single individual, the term refers to one or more anonymous creators who are thought to have produced large-scale bronzes in late Hellenistic and Roman styles. These works reportedly entered the international art market in the 1970s, often lacking verifiable provenance and circulating largely within Anglo-American trade networks. The forgery workshop seems to have been notably active during the 1990s, and its crafting would appear to reflect a consistently high level of professionalism from archaeological, artistic, and technical perspectives.

== Forgery in classical studies ==
The authentication of artworks that appear ancient presents a persistent methodological challenge in the study of classical antiquity. Genuine objects are often subject to gradual alteration through restoration, reworking, and later interventions, which may obscure their original condition. At the same time, entirely modern creations can be deliberately fabricated to imitate ancient bronzes. As techniques of forgery have become increasingly sophisticated, such objects have entered both public and private collections, at times serving as reference points for further art-historical analysis. This situation complicates the distinction between authentic antiquities and modern imitations and underscores the risks inherent in relying on insufficiently verified material.

== Spanish Master Workshop Hypothesis ==
Lehmann's attribution of numerous objects to the "Spanish Master" rests chiefly on stylistic analysis. He claims to identified recurring features such as emotionally charged facial expressions and formal inconsistencies that, and in his view, diverge from established conventions of ancient portraiture. Central to his hypothesis is the assertion that plaster casts of genuine antiquities were used to create molds, which were subsequently altered, recombined, and reworked into new compositions. This process, he argues, produced visually persuasive but ultimately anachronistic objects that imitate ancient prototypes without adhering to their formal or technical logic. For example, a group of bronze portraits appears to share notable similarities, including comparable surface treatment, closely related casting techniques, and stylistic features that are not easily reconciled with established ancient models. In addition, most of the portraits suggest being especially valuable, life-sized or slightly larger, private portraits and some similar to portraits of rulers. These characteristics may suggest a modern production source; however, they could equally be interpreted as variations within ancient workshop practices. Several prominent works have been associated with this hypothesis, most notably the so-called Stendal Alexander, a bronze portrait identified as Alexander the Great, as well as a number of other heads and busts that emerged on the art market in the late twentieth century. Lehmann proposes that these objects share a common origin in a professional modern workshop and, in some cases, links them to known dealers in the antiquities trade. His claims have been disseminated both in academic contexts and in journalistic investigations, contributing to wider public awareness of the issue of forged antiquities.

The hypothesis found support in academic personas like Christoph Leon and Josef Floren. But Lehmann's conclusions have been also met with substantial criticism. Scholars have questioned the methodological basis of his attributions, noting the limited and sometimes inconsistent use of metallurgical and archaeometric analyses, as well as insufficient engagement with securely provenanced comparanda. In several instances, scientific testing has suggested that the materials and fabrication techniques of disputed objects are compatible with ancient production. Critics have also emphasized that stylistic anomalies alone do not constitute conclusive evidence of modern forgery.

== Debate ==
The overall hypothesis surrounding the "Spanish Master" is contested. But the academic debate highlights broader methodological challenges in the authentication of ancient bronzes, particularly in cases where archaeological context and provenance are lacking. While Lehmann's hypothesis has drawn attention to the potential scale and sophistication of modern forgery practices, it remains controversial within the field; current approaches stress the necessity of integrating stylistic assessment with rigorous scientific analysis and comprehensive provenance research in order to establish the authenticity or modern origin of disputed works.

== See also ==
- Art forgery
- Archaeological forgery
- Authenticity in art

== Bibliography ==
- Stefan Lehmann (ed.), Authentizität und Originalität antiker Bronzebildnisse. Ein gefälschtes Augustusbildnis, seine Voraussetzungen und sein Umfeld / Authenticity and Originality of Ancient Bronze Portraits A Forged Portrait of Augustus, Its Prerequisites, and Its Surroundings. The contributions of the discussion forum on 5 May 2014 and the catalogue of the exhibition "The fake Augustus. A suspect bronze portrait of the first Roman Emperor" 8 May to 15 July 2014 in the Archäologisches Museum of the Martin-Luther-Universität Halle-Wittenberg (Dresden 2015), ISBN 978-3-95498-183-0. (English/German)
