= Sophie de Marbois-Lebrun, Duchess of Plaisance =

American socialite

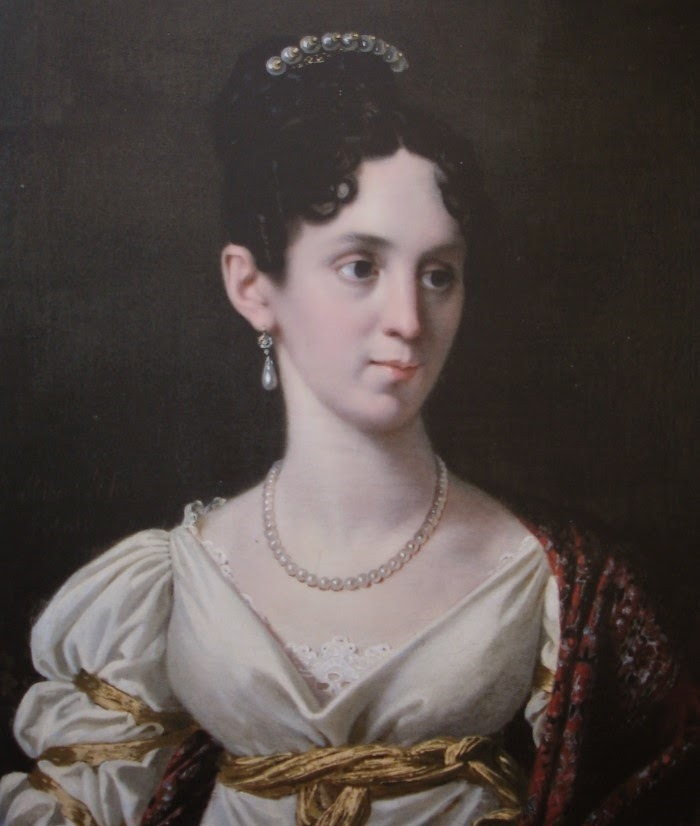
Duchess of Plaisance

Sophie de Marbois-Lebrun, Duchess of Plaisance (Greek: Δούκισσα της Πλακεντίας) (1785–1854) was a French noblewoman, known as an important figure in Greek high society the first decades after Greek independence. She was born in Philadelphia, Pennsylvania, where her father, François Barbé-Marbois, was serving as French Consul-General in the United States.

== Life ==
=== Early life ===
In 1802, Sophie married Anne-Charles Lebrun, the eldest son of Charles-François Lebrun later duc de Plaisance (this last one who along with Napoleon Bonaparte had served as one of three Consuls of France from 1799 to 1804). The marriage was unhappy and the couple separated without ever taking divorce; Sophie lived in Italy while the duke served as the governor of Holland from 1811 to 1813.

=== Greek War of Independence ===
Upon the outbreak of the Greek War of Independence, the Duchess and her daughter generously supported the Greek cause and in 1830, they moved to Nafplion, the capital of Greece at that time and she was reacquainted with the Greek leader Ioannis Kapodistrias whom she had met in Paris in 1826. She became an ardent financial supporter of public education. Eventually, she became an opponent of Kapodistrias, and after a 17-month stay, she left for Italy. When Kapodistrias was assassinated by Konstantinos Mavromichalis and his nephew Georgios Mavromichalis, she spoke out against the way Kapodistrias had run the Greek government.

=== Life in Athens ===
In 1834, the Duchess returned to Greece and settled in the new capital Athens. She purchased large amounts of agricultural land chiefly near Mt. Penteli, but all around Athens. She engaged the Greek architect, Stamatios Kleanthis to design a palace for her on the slopes of Mt. Penteli called Rododafni Castle. Meanwhile, in 1836, the Duchess and her daughter traveled to Beirut, where Eliza died of pneumonia. Such was the sorrow of the Duchess that she had her daughter's body embalmed and returned to Athens where it was placed in a crypt under her temporary home on Peiraios Street.

Kleanthis completed the Tower of the Duchess of Plaisance in 1841 and then set to work on Villa Illisia, which was completed in 1848. Today the Villa Illisia is the site of the Byzantine Museum. A central fixture in the social life of Othonian Athens, the Duchess would host symposia on various topics of religion and politics in her palace. She was also known to dole out funds and titles of courtesy to those whom she found favorable. Something of an iconoclast, the Duchess rejected the prevailing faith, Greek Orthodoxy, and instead converted to Judaism. She sponsored the reconstruction of a Jewish synagogue in Halkida in 1849.

Later in life, she commissioned Kleanthis to begin the construction of a final home and resting place for her beloved daughter's remains, the Castle of Rododafni. She would never live to see the house completed. In 1847, it caught fire and was burned to the ground. After that, the Duchess withdrew from public life only agreeing to see her old friend, Fotini Mavromichali, lady-in-waiting for Queen consort Amalia of Oldenburg.

She was described by the diarist Christiane Lüth who became her neighbor in 1842:

"On one side of us lived the French duchess de Plaisance, an eccentric lady, rich, divorced from her husband and neither Jew nor Christian. She had created her own faith, which she had printed in French and handed out to people. We were also given a copy. She had but one daughter, who died, when she was sixteen, and the mother placed her remains in alcohol in a great glass jar which she placed in a room of her basement, which she visited in order to remember her daughter. [...] Some years later the duchess' house caught fire and she visited one neighbor after another and asked them passionately to save the corpse in exchange for a great reward, but no one wished to venture down there, so it was burnt. She had six big white furry dogs, who accompanied her everywhere, also when she went driving, some of them in her back seat and the rest following behind. She was always dressed in white, draped in a big shawl, from which her pale yellow face and her big black eyes peered out. It was foretold that she would die after having finished building a house, and she therefore left those she built unfinished. [...] She never gave to beggars: „Je suis généreux, mais je ne donne pas des aumônes“, she said."

She died in 1854 and her nephew sold her lands to the Greek state. She is buried with her daughter in her Tower near Penteli.

== Legacy ==
Today an Athens Metro station, built on her original lands, is named Doukissis Plakentias station (Δουκίσσης Πλακεντίας).
