= Fotini Mavromichali =

Greek court office holder and royal mistress

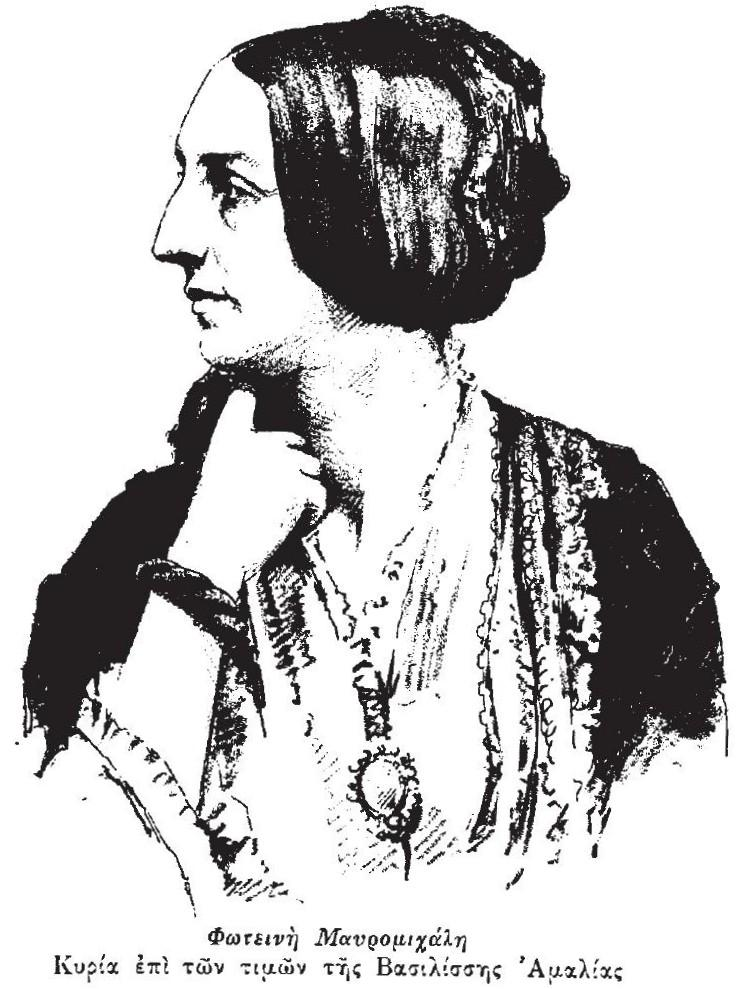
- Born: 1826
- Died: 1878 (aged 51–52)
- Family: Mavromichalis family

Fotini Mavromichali (Greek: Φωτεινή Μαυρομιχάλη; 1826–1878), was a Greek court office holder and royal mistress.

She was the granddaughter of Petrobey Mavromichalis. She was acquainted with Sophie de Marbois-Lebrun, Duchess of Plaisance, who taught her French and French etiquette.

In 1844 she became the lady-in-waiting (dame d'honneur) of the queen of Greece, Amalia of Oldenburg after Katerina Botsari, who retired from court service that year. Fotini Mavromichali was described as a beauty, and became a popular figure at the court. She accompanied the queen on her visit to Berlin in 1849.

She is described as the only confirmed extramarital love affair of king Otto of Greece, an affair that resulted in her dismissal and a conflict between the Mavromichalis family and the queen.
