= Rododafni Castle =

Chateau in Greece

Coordinates: 38°02′44″N 23°52′14″E

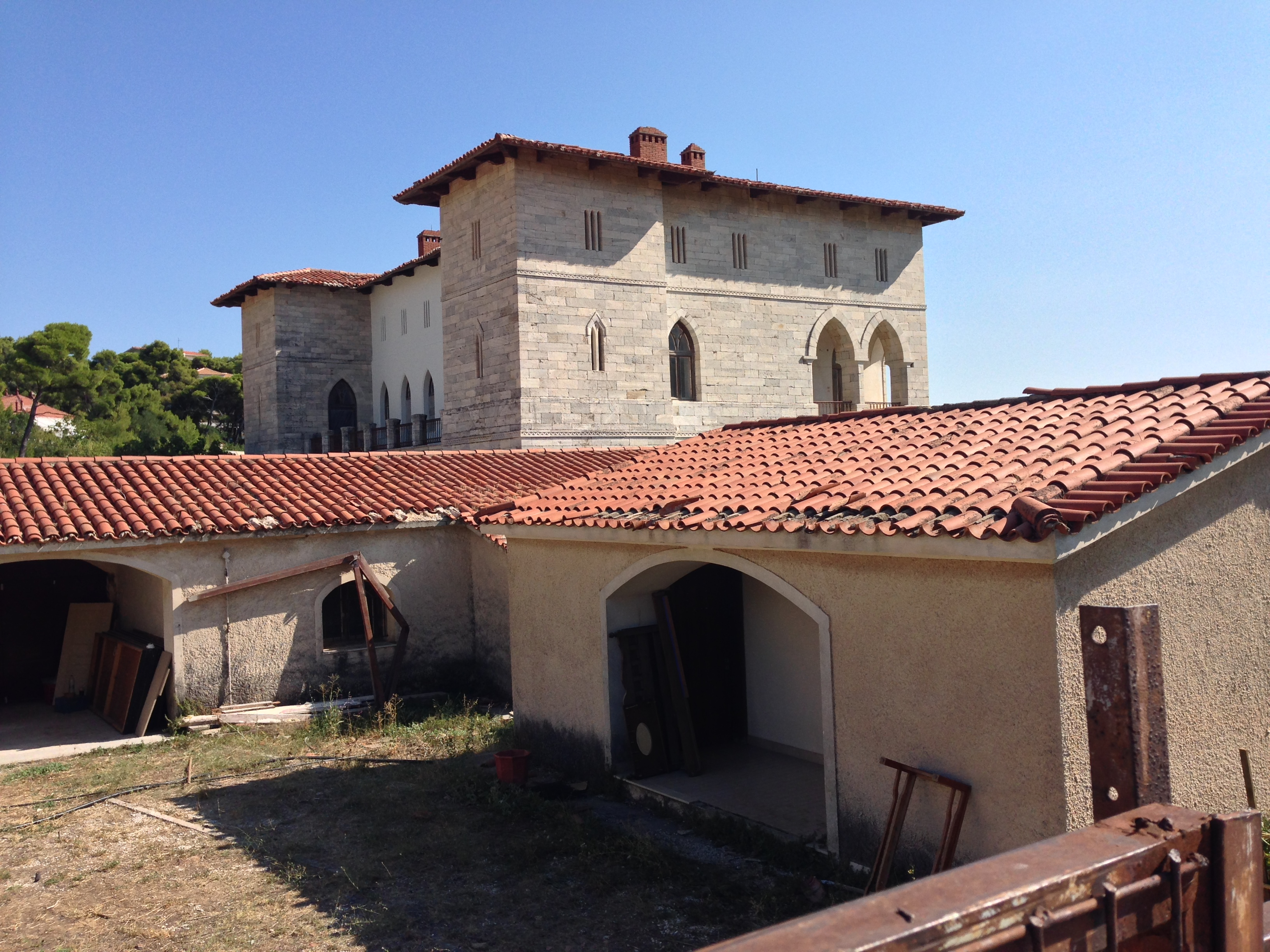
View from the hills

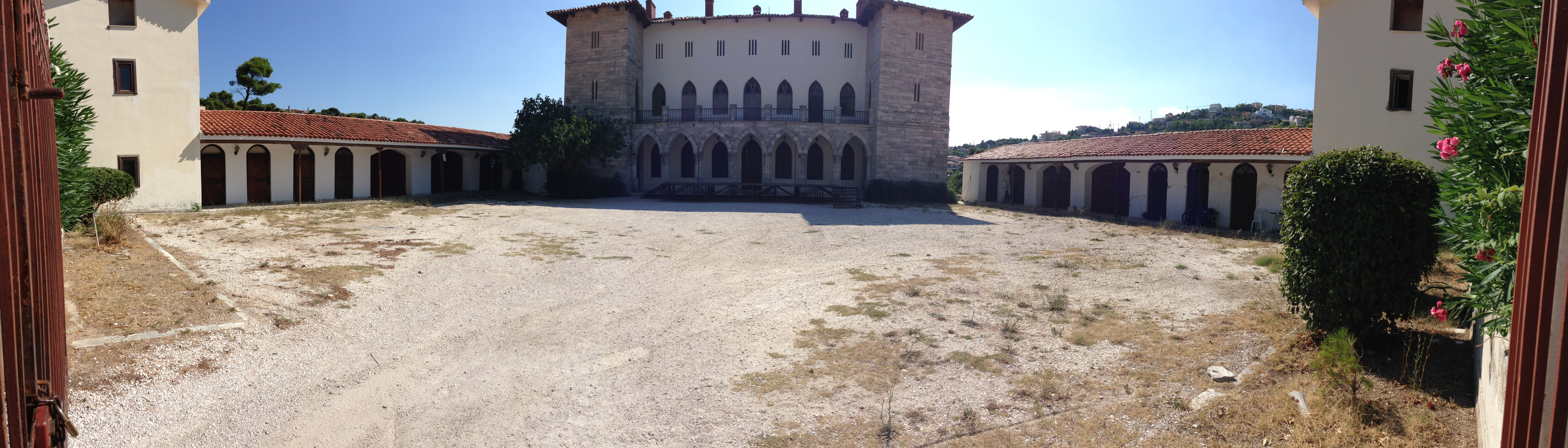
View from the garden

Rododafni castle (Greek: Καστέλλο της Ροδοδάφνης) is a palace in Penteli, Greece. It is located on the Lord Byron street (Greek: οδού Λόρδου Βύρωνος) on the slope of mount Pentelicus. It was intended as a summer residence for Sophie de Marbois-Lebrun, Duchess of Plaisance and is designed in a neo-gothical style, which was uncommon in 19th century Greece. The name of the palace means Rosetree castle.

== History ==
Sophie de Marbois was married to Charles-François Lebrun, the former finance minister of Napoleon, who was awarded the title of Duc de Plaisance. They had a daughter named Caroline-Elisa (1804-1837). Her mother and she were both staunch supporters of the “Greek cause”. They actively and financially supported the Greek revolution in 1821. After separating from her husband, the Duchess settled in Greece. Due to her vast financial resources, she was able to purchase large tracts of land in Athens and surrounding Attica, primarily in Penteli, on which she erected not less than six palaces and houses. Two of them were located in Athens and the other four in Penteli.

The Villa Ilissia was her main house in Athens and was used as her winter residence. Today, it houses the Byzantine and Christian Museum. The Rododafni castle was intended as her summer residence and as a resting place for her daughter’s remains. Greek literature always attributed the design to the Greek architect Stamatios Kleanthis, but the historian Olga Fountoulakis discovered that the French architect André Couchaud was the main designer of the palace. Although Kleanthis was involved in the design of the auxiliary buildings of Rododafni. Construction started in 1840 using local Penteli marble. The Duchess did not see her palace completed as she died in 1854. There is a local legend that she had left the Penteli buildings half-finished without roofs and windows due to the superstitious fear that she would die when one of them was finished according to the French writer Edmon About, who was befriended with the Duchess.

The Duchess’ nephew sold the estate and ownership transferred to the Greek state. The building remained uninhabited and in ruins for more than a century. In 1959, the Greek state started with renovations using public funds. The architect Alexandros Baltzatis completed the restoration in 1961. The intention was to use the castle as a country house for the Greek crown prince. As such, the future King Constantine II of Greece used the palace from 1961 to 1964. Nowadays, it belongs to the municipality of Penteli, who uses it as a cultural centre and library, as well as for (cultural) events up to 1,000 people.

== Sources ==
- Badima-Fountoulakis, Olga (2002). Σταμάτης Κλεάνθης (1802-1862). Αρχιτέ-κτων, επιχειρηματίας, οραματιστής (in Greek). Δήμος Αθηναίων Πολιτισμικός Οργανισμός. ISBN 9607401387.
- ΚΑΙΡΟΦΥΛΑΣ Κ. ΓΙΑΝΝΗΣ (2004). ΤΟ ΚΑΣΤΕΛΟ ΤΗΣ ΡΟΔΟΔΑΦΝΗΣ Η ΑΛΗΘΙΝΗ ΙΣΤΟΡΙΑ ΤΗΣ ΔΟΥΚΙΣΣΑΣ ΤΗΣ ΠΛΑΚΕΝΤΙΑΣ (in Greek). ΦΙΛΙΠΠΟΤΗΣ.
- Kardamitsi-Adami, Maro (2009). Palaces in Greece. Melissa Books. ISBN 9789602042892.
- Badima-Fountoulakis, Olga (2011). Η Δούκισσα της Πλακεντίας και οι Αρχιτέκτονές της (in Greek). Μαλακό εξώφυλλο. ISBN 9789609330664.
- Fountoulakis, Olga (2020). Deutsche Architekten im Griechenland des 19. Jahrhunderts (in German). Eptalofos. ISBN 9786188497801.
- Scully Jr, Vincet (1963). "Kleanthes and the Duchess of Piacenza". Journal of the Society of Architectural Historians. 22: 139 onwards.
- Fountoulakis, Olga (2002). "Hansen or Kleanthes: Who was the Architect of the Buildings of the Duchess of Piacenza in Athens?". Architectura (Journal of the History of Architecture). 32: 53–63.
- Fountoulakis, Olga (2009). "André Couchaud, der Architekt des Kastells Rododafni in Penteli (ΦΟΥΝΤΟΥΛΑΚΗ Όλγα, André Couchaud, ο αρχιτέκτων του Καστέλου της Ροδοδάφνης στην Πεντέλη)" (PDF). Archäologie (Αρχαιολογία) (in Greek and German). 112: 87–93.
- Fountoulakis, Olga (2024). The Architects of the Buildings of the Duchess of Piacenza in Attica, Greece (in Greek and English). p. 38.
