= Katerina Botsari =

Greek courtier and painting subject (died 1872)

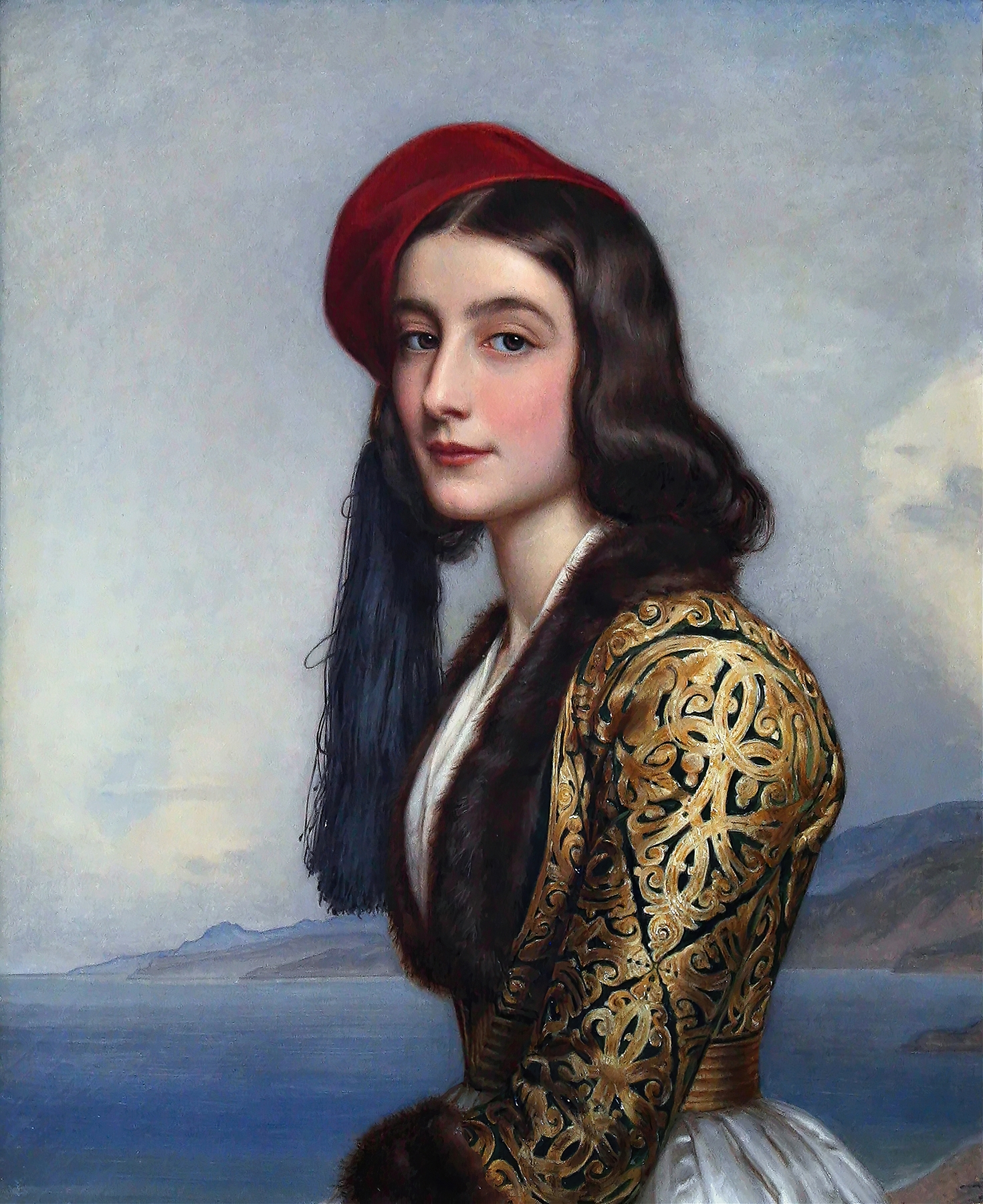
1841 portrait of Katerina Botsari by Joseph Karl Stieler

Katerina "Rosa" Botsari (Greek: Κατερίνα Μπότσαρη; 1818/1820 – 1872) was a Greek courtier. She was member of the Souliot Botsaris family. The daughter of Markos Botsaris, she was in the service of Queen Amalia of Greece as well as an admired young woman throughout the European courts; she was immortalised for the 'Gallery of Beauties' of Ludwig I of Bavaria in Stieler's 1841 painting. A damask rose species bred in 1856 was named Rosa Botsaris after her. In 1845, she married prince and general George Caradja.

== Biography ==
Born in 1818 or in 1820 in Ioannina, then a regional capital in the Ottoman Empire. She was the daughter of Markos Botsaris, a chieftain and hero of the Greek Revolution. When the Greek Revolution broke out, Ekaterini was in Ioannina. She and other women were captured by the authorities and transferred to a distant land of the Ottoman Empire, within its European territories. During her time in captivity, she was put under the protection of upper class Ottoman women. In fact, it seems that one of them tried to adopt her. In the end, however, after the prisoner exchange, Ekaterini returned to her family and later she went to the newly created Greek state.

After the marriage of the newly elected king Otto in 1836, a household was formed for his spouse Queen Amalia, and Katerina Botsari was appointed to the post of lady-in-waiting. She was one of few Greek courtiers in the court of Otto and Amalia, which was mostly composed of Germans before 1843. She was the described by the diarist Christiane Lüth:

"Of the two young ladies-in-waiting, Miss von Wiesenthau was not very well mannered, Catholic and not pretty, although she talked constantly. The Greek, very beautiful Rosa Botzaris was not agreeable, but stingy and hated everything German. She was poor, but the glory which surrounded the name of her father, the freedom hero, Marko Botzaris, shone its light over her. When she travelled with the Queen, she was much celebrated for her beauty, which was highlighted by her national costume. She hid the fact that she understood the German language and spread dangerous political comments around her which much damaged their Majesties, her benefactors."

As lady-in-waiting, she accompanied Amalia to her official visits in the royal courts of various European countries. In 1844, she was honored by the king of Bavaria, Ludwig I, with a Ludwig Order Cross. Furthermore, during her stay in Bavaria, she won the admiration of the public, not only for her beauty, but also for being the daughter of the famous fighter Markos Botsaris. At the same time, she had her portrait made by the German painter Joseph Karl Stieler. The portrait now resides at the Gallery of Beauties, in Nymphenburg Palace, in Munich.

She left her service of court in 1844 when she married, and was replaced as lady-in-waiting by Fotini Mavromichali.

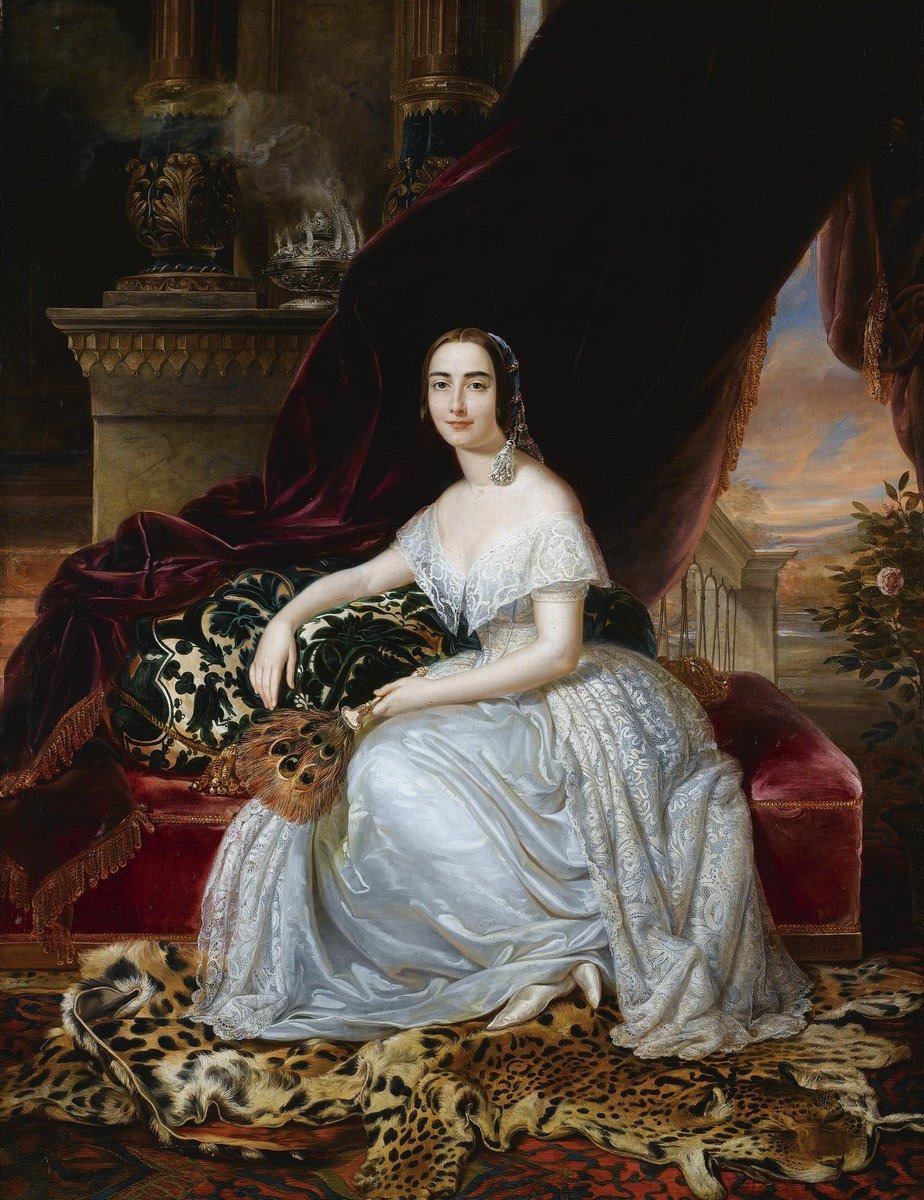
1845 painting of Katerina Botsari by Pietro Luchini

Ekaterini married general Prince Georgios Caradja (1802–1882), and together they had four children, two of which died at a young age.

She died in Athens in January 1875.

The formal attire she wore during her time at Queen Amalia's court is preserved at the National Historical Museum in Athens.

== Bibliography ==
- Ioannis Arsenis [Ιωάννης Αρσένης], ed. Ποικίλη Στοά: Εθνική εικονογραφημένη επετηρίς. Εστία, Αθήνα.
- Theodoros Velianitis [Θεόδωρος Βελιανίτης], Κ. Μάισνερ και Ν. Καργαδούρης. επιμ. Η Ελλάς κατά τους Ολυμπιακούς Αγώνας του 1896. Εστία, Αθήνα.
