= Dormition of the Theotokos Monastery, Penteli =

Greek Orthodox monastery

Dormition of the Theotokos Monastery
- Ιερά Μονή Κοιμήσεως της Θεοτόκου Πεντέλης
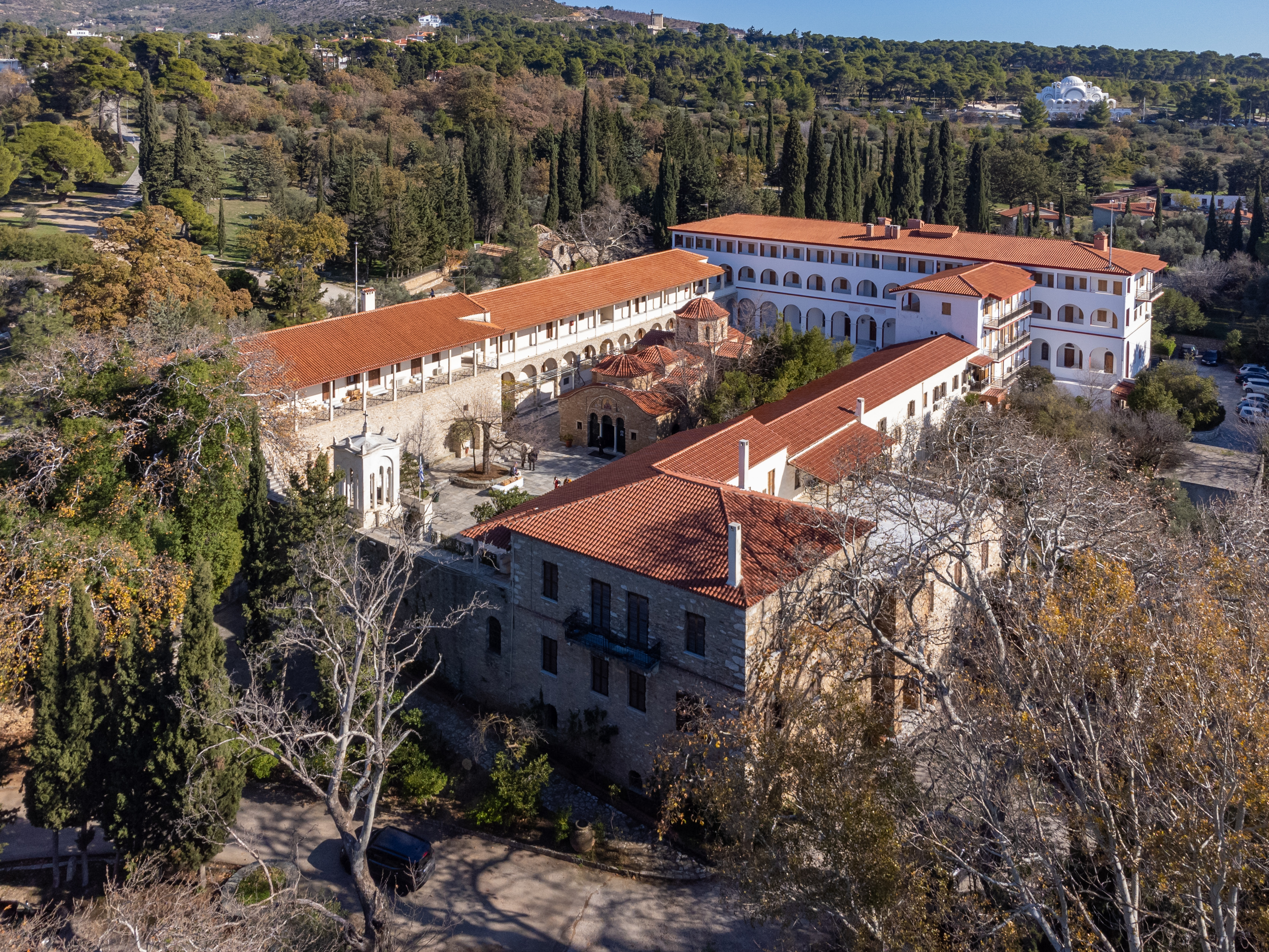
- Interactive map of Dormition of the Theotokos Monastery

Monastery information
- Other names: Penteli Monastery
- Established: 1578
- Dedicated to: Dormition of Theotokos
- Celebration date: August 15 & 16; Monday of the Holy Spirit
- Diocese: Archbishopric of Athens

Site
- Location: Penteli, Attica
- Country: Greece
- Coordinates: 38°3′9″N 23°52′0″E

The Holy Monastery of the Dormition of the Theotokos (Greek: Ιερά Μονή Κοιμήσεως της Θεοτόκου) is a men's monastery, which today belongs to the Archbishopric of Athens. It is located on the southern side of Mount Penteli, and is therefore also known as the Penteli Monastery (Ιερά Μονή Πεντέλης).

The monastery was founded in 1578. Its founder was Saint Timotheos of Euripos. Almost from its foundation, the monastery held stauropegic status, that is, directly attached to the Patriarch of Constantinople. Since 1858, it has been under the jurisdiction of the Archbishopric of Athens.

During the Ottoman period, the monastery owned numerous lands located on Mount Penteli, as well as in other regions of Attica. The monastery was destroyed in the aftermath of the Venetian occupation of Athens in 1688–1690, and then during the Greek War of Independence. In 2010, the monastery had 58 monks, 17 of whom lived there permanently.

The monastery is built at an altitude of about 430 meters. From the outside, its high walls and heavy doors give it the appearance of a fortress. The main church of the monastery, or Katholikon, is in post-Byzantine style. The monastery buildings have a capacity of 120 monks. The monastery also houses a museum, as well as a library.

The monastery celebrates the 15th (Dormition of the Theotokos) and 16 August (memory of the founder, Saint Timotheos), as well as the Monday of the feast of the Holy Spirit.

== Sources ==
- Αλβανάκης, Διονύσιος Σ. «Ιστορία των Ιερών Μονών του Κράτους Α΄ Μοναί Μητροπόλεως Αθηνών. τ. 1: Ιερά Μονή Πεντέλης» Εν Αθήναις Εκ των Τυπογραφικών Καταστημάτων Αθ. Παπασπύρου - Ιω. Δεουδέ,1905.
- Καμπούρογλου, Δημήτριος Γρ. «Ιστορία των Αθηναίων : Τουρκοκρατία : Περίοδος πρώτη, 1458-1687», εκδίδοται υπό Αλεξάνδρου Παπαγεωργίου, τ. 2. Εν Αθήναις: Εκ του τυπογραφείου Α. Παπαγεωργίου, 1890, σελ. 216–228.
- Χρυσόστομος Παπαδόπουλος: Η εκκλησία των Αθηνών, Αθήνα 1928, σελ. 116.
- Σοφοκλής Γ. Δημητρακόπουλος, Εκκλησίες και Μοναστήρια των Αθηνών, έκδοση "ΑΛΛΗΛΕΓΓΥΗ", Αθήνα 2006.
