= Pentele =

Coordinates: 38°04′36″N 23°52′18″E

Pentele (Ancient Greek: Πεντέλη) was a deme of ancient Attica, situated at the north-eastern extremity of the Athenian plain, at the marble quarries of Mount Brilessus, which was called Mount Pentelicus from this place. The fact of Pentele being a deme rests upon the authority of Stephanus of Byzantium alone, and has not yet been confirmed by inscriptions.

The site of Pentele is tentatively located near modern Penteli.
