= Minuscule 609 =

- New Testament manuscript
- Text: Gospel of Luke †
- Date: 1043
- Script: Greek–Arabic
- Now at: Bibliothèque nationale de France; National Library of Russia
- Size: 17.5 cm by 13.6 cm
- Type: Byzantine text-type
- Category: none
- Note: K^{x}

Minuscule 609 (in the Gregory-Aland numbering), ε ^{161} (von Soden), is a Greek–Arabic diglot minuscule manuscript of the New Testament, on parchment. It is dated by a colophon to the year 1043. The manuscript is lacunose.

== Description ==
The codex contains the text of the Gospel of Luke on 317 parchment leaves (size 17.5 cm by 13.6 cm), with lacunae. The leaves 67-73 were written by a later hand. The writing is in two columns per page, 17-18 lines per page. It contains the Ammonian Sections but without references to the Eusebian Canons.

== Text ==
The Greek text of the codex is a representative of the Byzantine text-type. Hermann von Soden classified it to the textual family K^{x}. Aland did not place it in any Category. According to the Claremont Profile Method it creates the textual group M609 with Codex Campianus. Some of its peculiar readings are as follows (in all of these, the Arabic column agrees with the Byzantine Text unless noted otherwise):

- It lacks ἐντεῦθεν in Luke 4:9, along with E G H 28.
- It lacks καὶ λέγοντα in Luke 4:41, along with 019 and 1241.
- It adds ώστε μη δυναςαι αναγαγείν αυτό to the end of Luke 5:6.
- It reads καὶ ἄλλων in Luke 5:29 instead of καὶ ἁμαρτωλῶν, the reading in the Arabic text and N W X 213 262 443 517 954 1071 1424 1675.
- It omits καὶ εἰσὶν πρῶτοι οἳ ἔσονται ἔσχατοι from the end of Luke 13:30.
- It reads ἄριστον in Luke 14:15 instead of ἄρτον, the reading in the Arabic text and p^{75} א^{1} A^{c} B D K* L N P Δ Θ Ψ f^{1} 579 892 1241 2542.

== History ==
The manuscript was written by Euphemius, a clergyman. Formerly it was held in Church of the Holy Sepulchre (No. 6) in Jerusalem. It was slightly examined by Martin (p. 99), Henri Omont, and Kurt Treu. Gregory saw the manuscript in 1885.

The manuscript currently is housed at the Bibliothèque nationale de France (Suppl. Gr. 911, 315 fol.), at Paris.

Two leaves of the same codex with the text of Luke 8:8-14 were designated by number 2152 on the list Gregory-Aland and it is housed at the National Library of Russia (Gr. 290, 2 fol.) in Saint Petersburg.

== See also ==
- List of New Testament minuscules
- Biblical manuscript
- Textual criticism
