= Minuscule 712 =

- New Testament manuscript
- Name: Codex Algerina Peckower 1
- Text: Gospels, Acts, Pauline epistles
- Date: 11th century
- Script: Greek
- Now at: University of California
- Size: 15.5 cm by 12.7 cm
- Type: ?
- Category: none
- Note: –

Minuscule 712 (in the Gregory-Aland numbering), δ160 (von Soden), Rahlfs 1913 for the Psalter part, is a Greek minuscule manuscript of the New Testament, on parchment. Palaeographically it has been assigned to the 11th century. The manuscript has complex contents. Scrivener labelled it as 560^{e}.

== Description ==
The codex contains the text of the four Gospels, Acts of the Apostles, Catholic epistles, and Pauline epistles, on 245 parchment leaves (size 15.5 cm by 12.7 cm).

The text is written in one column per page, 33 lines per page. The leaves are arranged in quarto. The manuscript is ornamented. Some leaves with Psalms were added by a later hand on paper.

The manuscript begins with a picture of saint Matthew. The text is divided according to the κεφαλαια (chapters), whose numbers are given at the left margin of the text and their τιτλοι (titles) are given at the top. The text is divided according to the Ammonian Sections (in Mark 234, the last section in 16:9), which numbers are given at the margin, with a references to the Eusebian Canons. It contains lectionary markings, subscriptions, numbers of στιχοι, Synaxarion, and Menologion. The original manuscript contained pictures.

On the last leaf is written in uncial letters: ως ηδους τοις πλεουσιν ο ευδιος λιμην | ουτος και τους γραφουσιν ο εσχατος στιχος. ιωαννικιου μοναχου.

== Text ==
Kurt Alandt he Greek text of the codex did not place in any Category.

It was not examined by using the Claremont Profile Method.

== History ==
Scrivener and Gregory dated the manuscript to the 11th century. Currently the manuscript is dated by the INTF to the 11th century.

The manuscript was bought in 1876 from Bernard Quaritch.

It was added to the list of New Testament manuscripts by Scrivener (560) and Gregory (712). Gregory saw the manuscript in 1883.

At present the manuscript is housed at the "Department of Special Collections" (170/347. 240 fol) in the University of California in Los Angeles. Formerly it was held in Cambridge.

5 leaves of the codex designated by number 2164 on the list Gregory-Aland are housed at the National Library of Russia (Gr. 320, 5 fol (Jude 12–25)) in Saint Petersburg.

The fragment housed in Petersburg was examined by Kurt Treu.

== See also ==
- List of New Testament minuscules
- Biblical manuscript
- Textual criticism
