= Athens University Museum =

Coordinates: 37°58′23.15″N 23°43′36.45″E

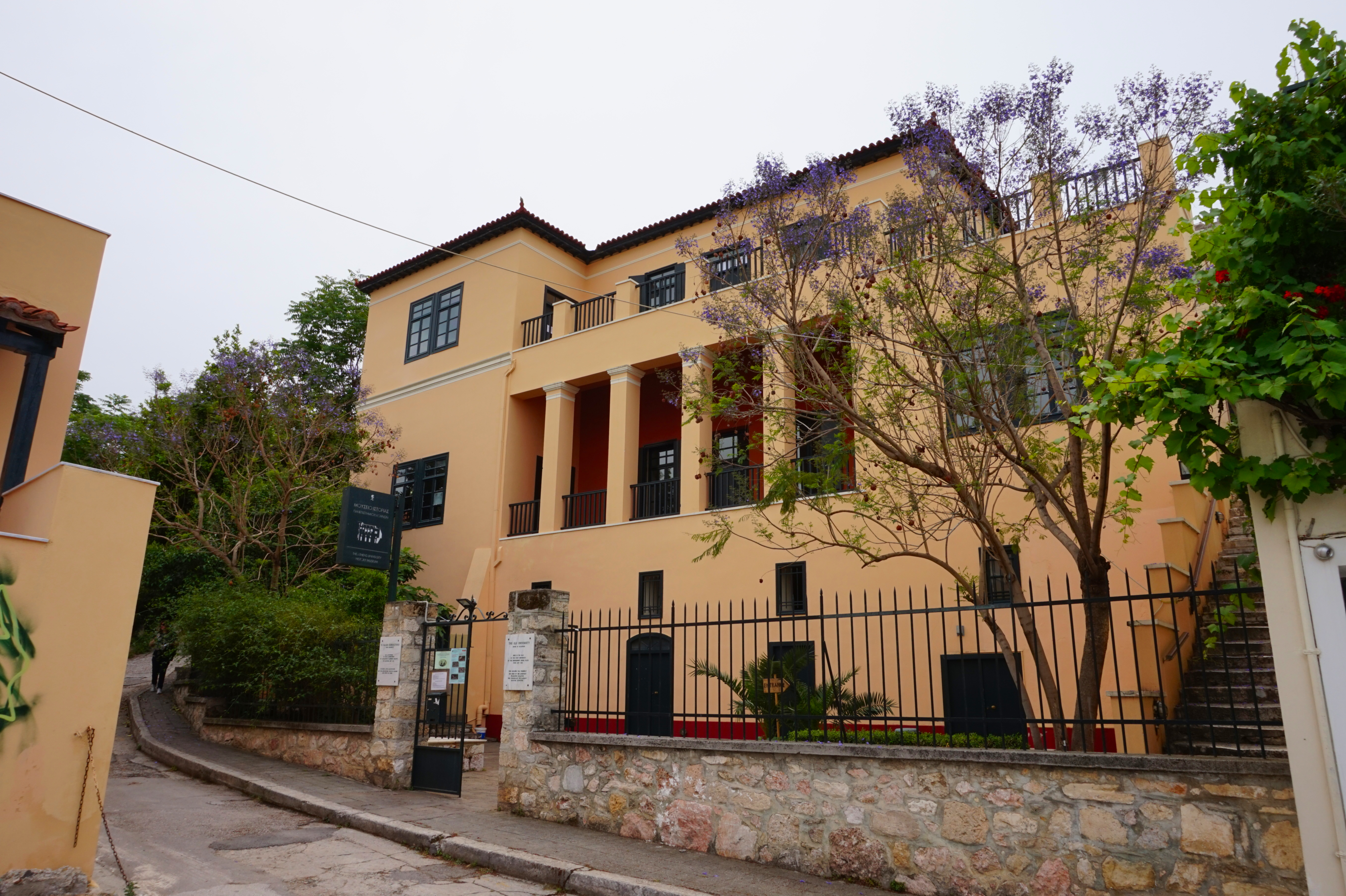
- Established: 1987
- Location: 5 Tholou Str., Athens, Greece
- Type: University museum
- Public transit access: Athens Metro stations: Monastiraki station
- Website: Official website

The Athens University Museum (Greek: Μουσείο Ιστορίας Πανεπιστημίου Αθηνών) is a museum in Plaka, Athens, Greece.

The building was a structure of the Ottoman period but fundamentally restructured between 1831 and 1833 by Stamatios Kleanthis and Eduard Schaubert for their architectural office. From 1837 to 1841 it housed the newly founded University of Athens.
