= Penteli, Greece =

Penteli Πεντέλη
- Municipality
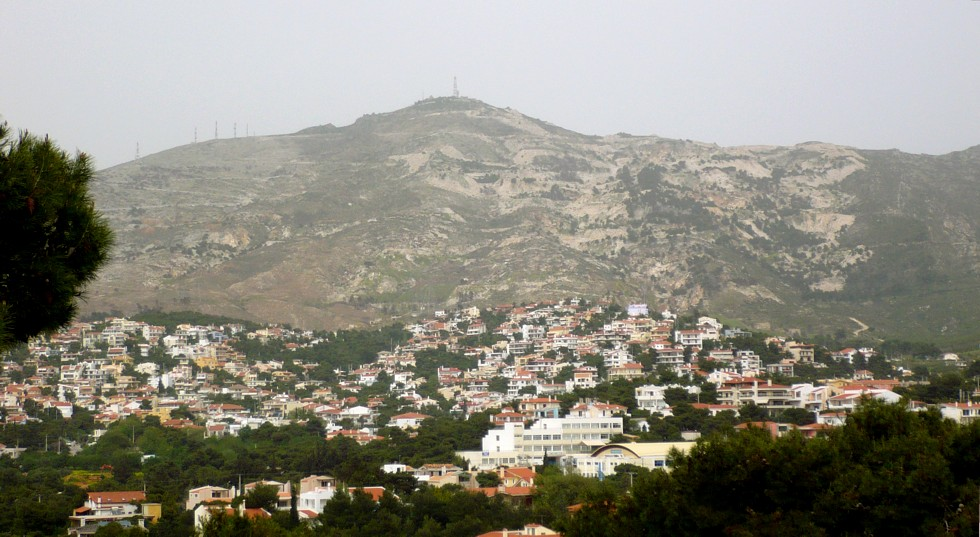

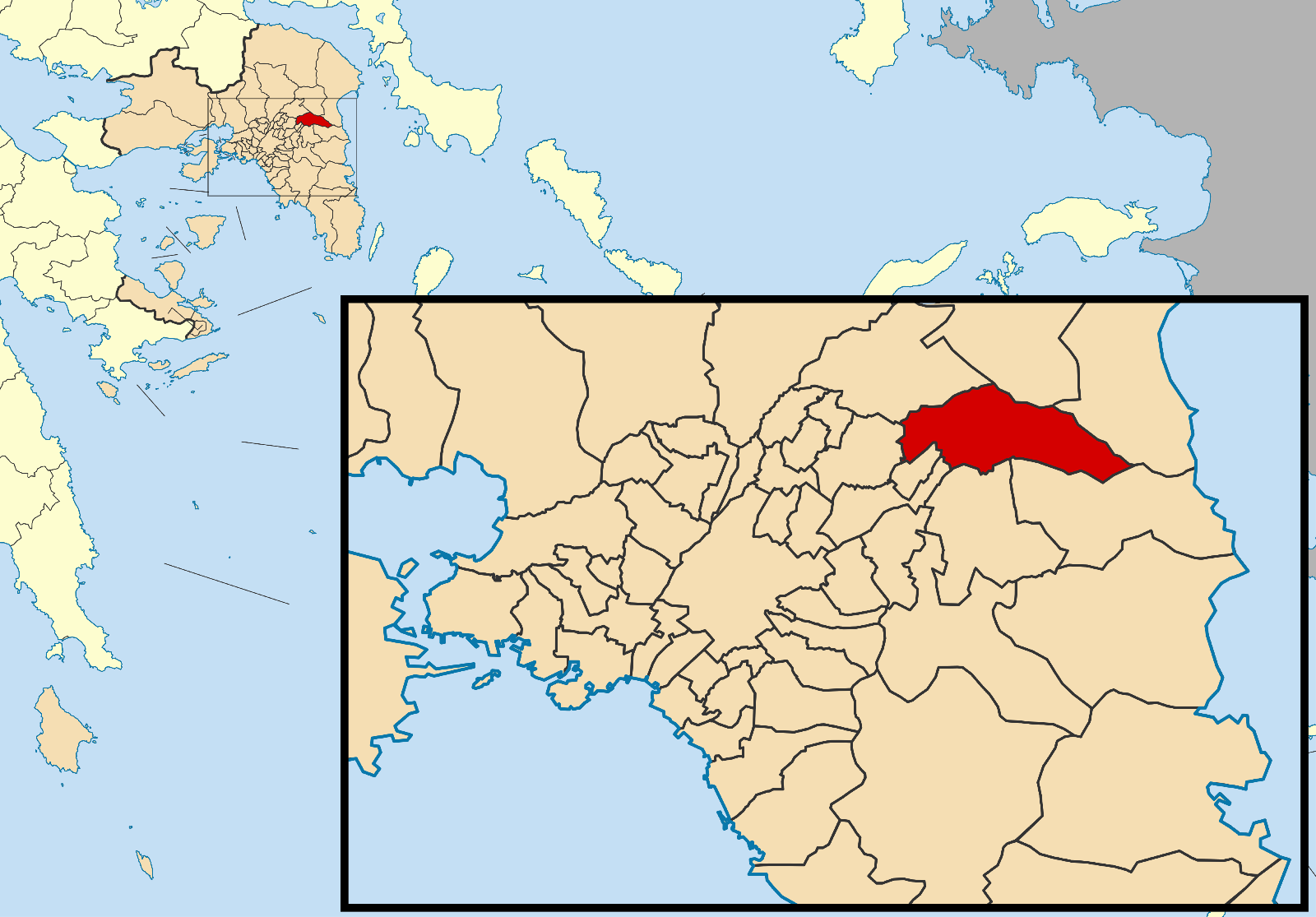

- Location within Greece
- Coordinates: 38°03′09″N 23°52′06″E
- Country: Greece
- Administrative region: Attica
- Regional unit: North Athens

Government
  - Mayor: Natassa Kosmopoulou (since 2023)

Area
  - Municipality: 36.064 km^{2} (13.924 sq mi)
  - Municipal unit: 28.878 km^{2} (11.150 sq mi)
- Elevation: 422 m (1,385 ft)

Population (2021)
  - Municipality: 35,610
  - Density: 987.4/km^{2} (2,557/sq mi)
  - Municipal unit: 5,076
  - Municipal unit density: 175.8/km^{2} (455.3/sq mi)
- Time zone: UTC+2 (EET)
  - Summer (DST): UTC+3 (EEST)
- Postal code: 152 36
- Area code: 210
- Vehicle registration: Z
- Website: penteli.gov.gr

Penteli (Greek: Πεντέλη) is a village and a municipality in the North Athens regional unit, Attica, Greece. Belonging to the Athens rural area, it takes its name from Mount Pentelicus.

== Municipality ==
The municipality Penteli was formed at the 2011 local government reform by the merger of the following 3 former municipalities, that became municipal units:

- Melissia
- Nea Penteli
- Penteli

== Geography ==
Penteli is situated on the southern slopes of the limestone Penteli mountains. The municipality has an area of 36.064 km^{2}, the municipal unit Penteli 28.878 km^{2}. It is 14 km northeast of central Athens. Some of the neighbourhoods of Penteli are Agia Triada, Agios Dimitrios, Daou and Kallithea.

== History ==
The bones of prehistoric animals - mastodons, rhinoceros, antelope, and giraffe, along with giant turtles, hyenas and other animals no longer extant in the area - have been found among the limestone crags of the mountain that looms over the present suburb of Athens. The Penteli mountains were renowned in Classical Greece as well as in the Roman Empire as a source of "Pentelic" marble, notably used to build the Parthenon and the Tower of the Winds. The Romans constructed a 140-foot water tower and aqueduct to supply water to the city of Athens. Penteli is the site of the ancient town of Pentele.

During the Greek War of Independence, the French philhellene Sophie de Marbois-Lebrun, Duchess of Plaisance supported the revolutionary leaders. When she settled in Greece in 1834, she bought large plots of land in Athens and on the Penteli mountain. She had the Rododafni Castle built for her.

In July 1995, Penteli was ravaged by a large forest fire. According to Turkish former prime minister, Mesut Yilmaz, many of the forest fires that burned the Greek countryside during that summer were actually started by Turkish secret service agents. The forests of Penteli suffered damage again from the August 2007 fires.

== Historical population ==
Year	Municipal unit	Municipality
1981	2,286	-
1991	3,197	-
2001	4,829	-
2011	4,995	34,934
2021	5,076	35,610

== Sights ==
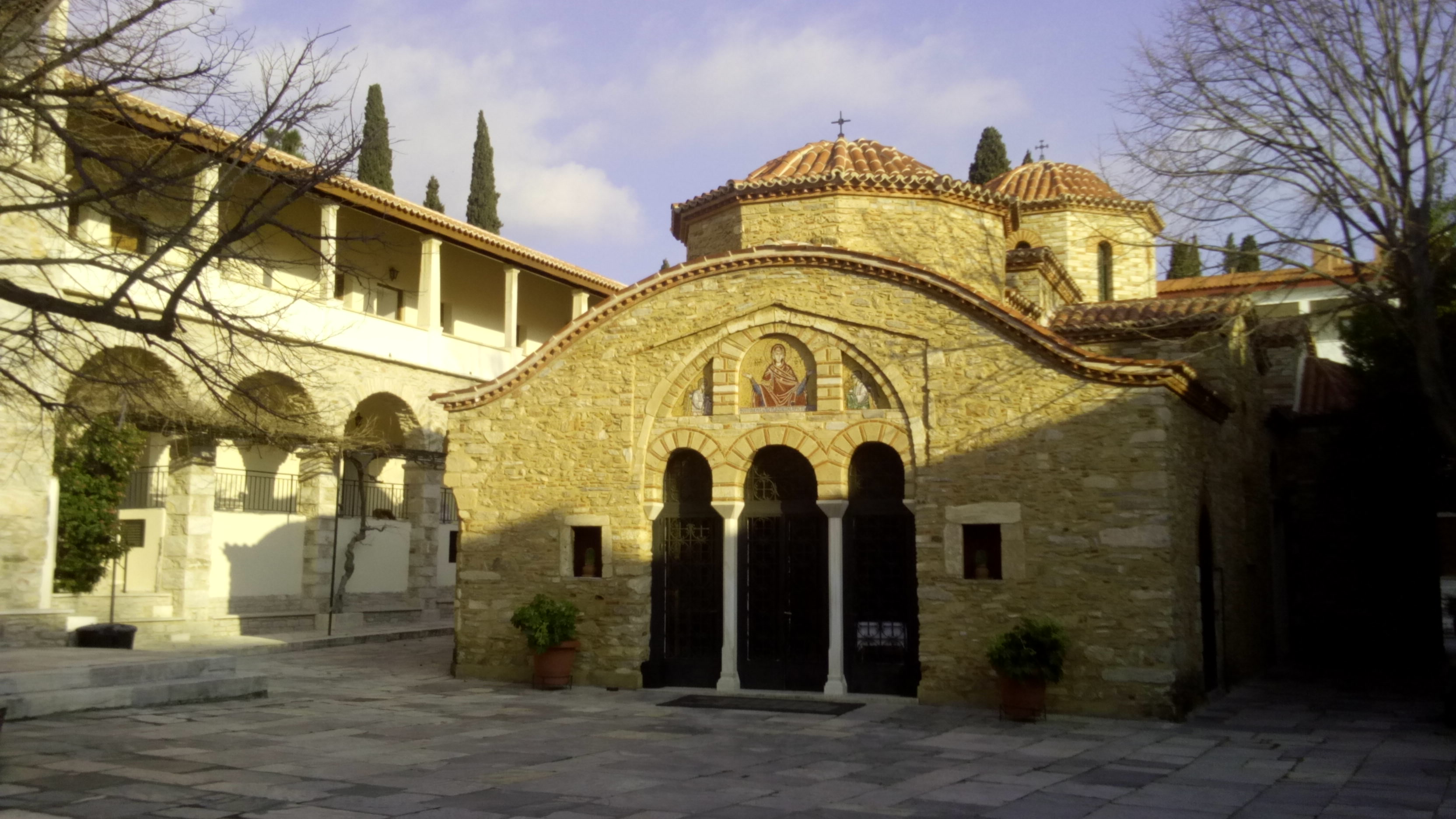
The monastery of Penteli

- Monastery of Penteli
- Rododafni Castle, also known as Pyrgos Doukissis Plakentias, a mansion built for the Duchess of Plaisance. Construction was started in 1840, but it was not finished until 1961, when Constantine II of Greece moved into it.
- The Penteli Astronomical Station of the National Observatory of Athens, completed in 1936

== Byzantine monuments ==
The catholicon of the old Monastery of St.Nicholas (Kallesia-Penteli). A wall painting monument of George Markou the Argus, the great and prolific post-Byzantine ecclesiastic iconographer of the 18th century.

== Gallery ==
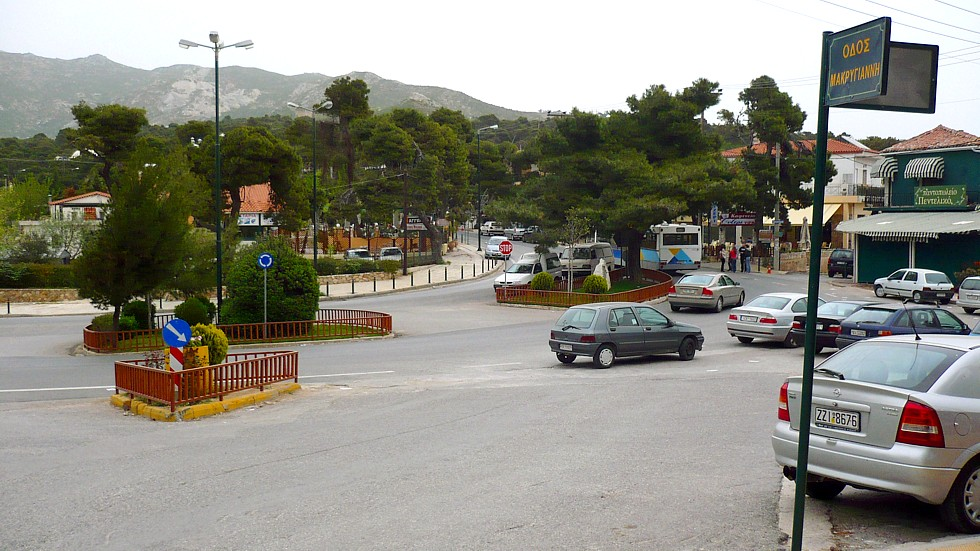
Center of Penteli

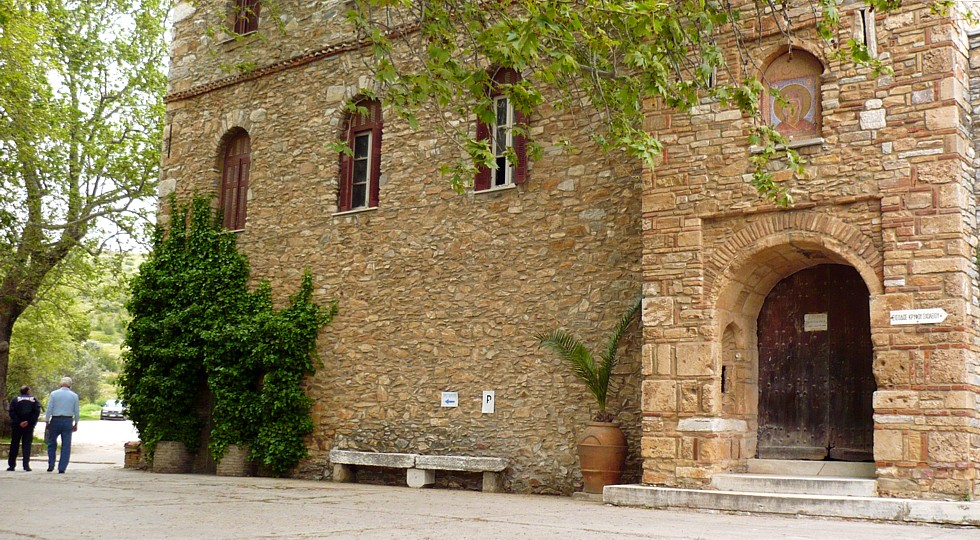
Penteli Monastery entrance

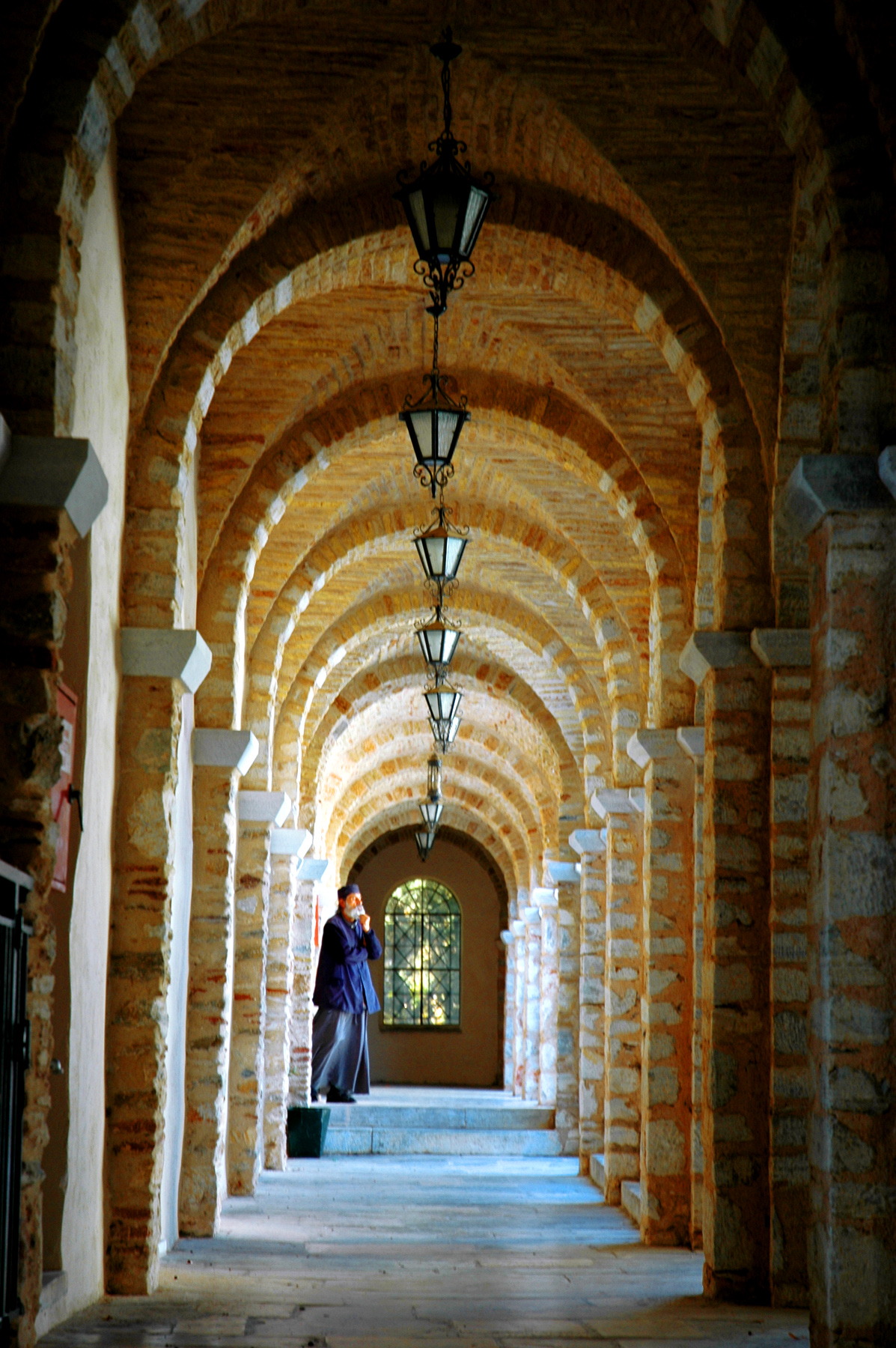
Inside the monastery of Penteli

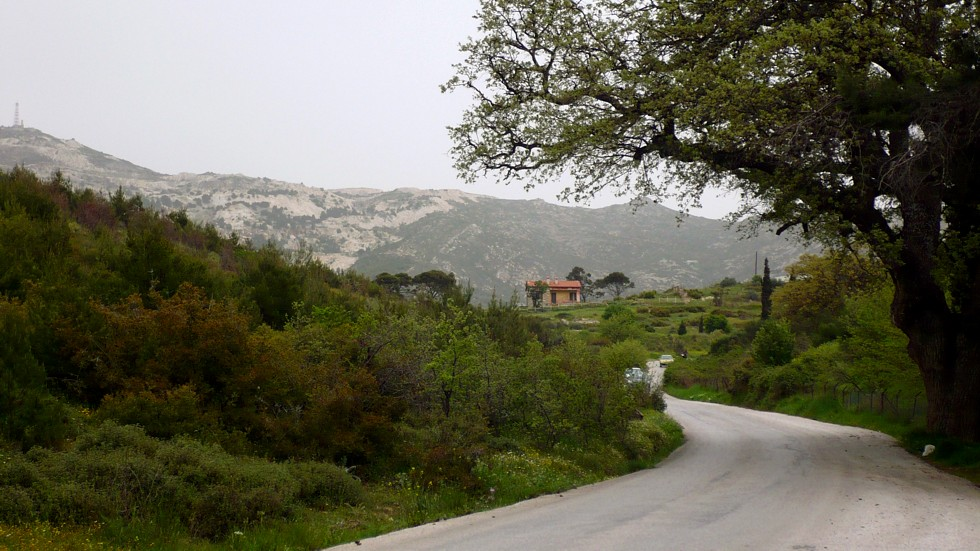
Penteli fields

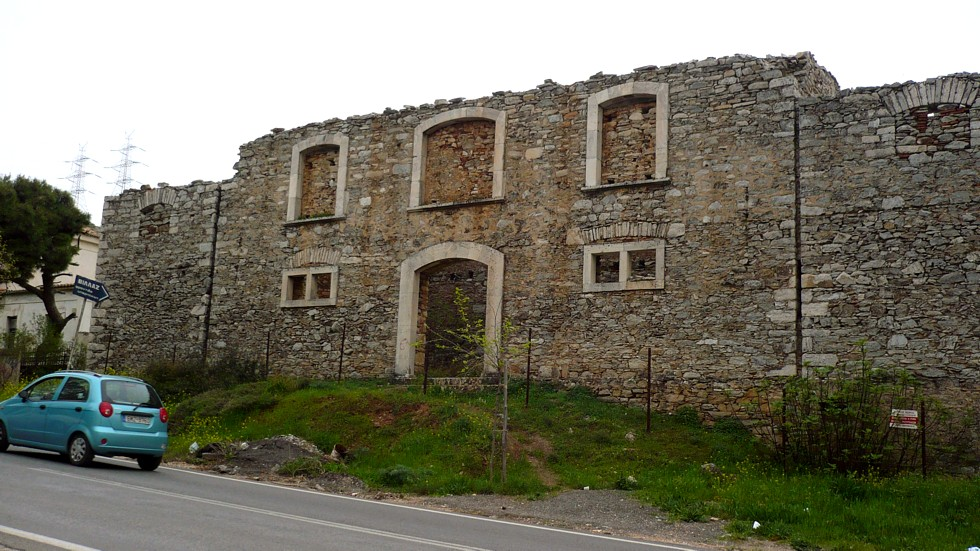
Tourelle tower

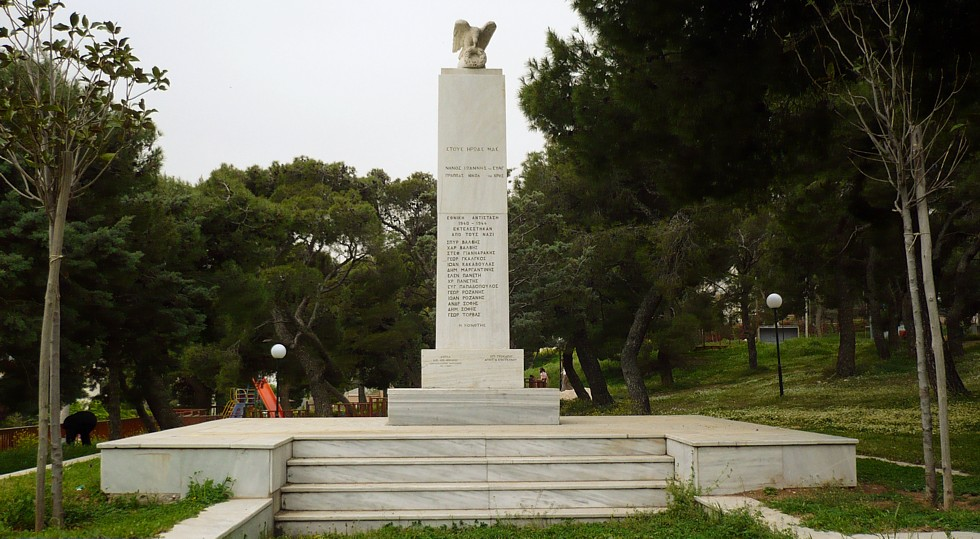
Penteli fallen residents monument

== See also ==
- List of settlements in Attica
