= Stefan Lehmann =

German classical archaeologist (born 1951)

Stefan Lehmann (born 13 November 1951 in Caputh) is a German classical archaeologist.

== Life ==
Stefan Lehmann studied classical archaeology, ancient history, art history and cultural history in Berlin and at the University of Bonn.Stefan Lehmann studied classical archeology, ancient history and art and cultural history at the Humboldt University in Berlin and at the University of Bonn. In 1985 he completed his studies with a master's degree and received his doctorate in 1987 in Bonn under Nikolaus Himmelmann with a thesis on the subject of magnificent mythological reliefs from the imperial era. Subsequently, he was curator of the exhibition Ancient Portraits from Yugoslavia at the Museum of Prehistory and Early History in Frankfurt am Main and employee at Academic Art Museum Bonn. He also worked at universities in Heidelberg, London (1991/1992: Honorary Research Fellow, Department of History, University College London) and Erlangen. Since 1994 he has been working in the German excavation in Olympia, where he first recorded the archaeological finds and findings on the statues of the Olympians and then dealt with the history of the sanctuary in the imperial era and late antiquity. Since 2002, Lehmann has been researching together with the ancient historian Andreas Gutsfeld from the University of Nancy as part of a research projectOlympia in late antiquity. Between 2002 and 2007 he worked in Münster for the research company Christian State and "Panhellenic" Shrines, which is funded by the DFG. On the change of Pagan cult sites in late ancient Greece In 2016 he was appointed "Membre associé du Center de recherche pour les Histoire et Cultures de l'Antiquité et du Moyen-Age (HISCANT-MA) à l'Université de Lorraine".

Lehmann completed his habilitation at the University of Halle in 1999/2000 with a work on the subject of statues of the victors in Olympia. He was awarded a teaching qualification and authorization for the subject of classical archeology. In 2009 he was appointed adjunct professor of classical archeology. In addition to his teaching activities, Lehmann has been heading the Archaeological Museum of the Martin Luther University Halle-Wittenberg since 2007, succeeding Manfred Oppermann. In his responsibility or joint responsibility, the museum showed several exhibitions, including Oskar Kokoschka's Antike: A European Vision of Modernism (2010, together with Katja Schneider), The wrong Augustus. A questionable bronze portrait of the first Roman emperor (2014), Goethe's very dearest Klytia - Metamorphoses of a Woman Bust (2016), The Discovery of Ancient Painting in the 18th Century: Turnbull - Paderni - Winckelmann (2017) and Ideale. Modern art since Winckelmann's antiquity (2018, together with Olaf Peters and Elisa Tamaschke). On the occasion of the university research and teaching collections conference in 2013, those responsible for collections at the University of Halle presented the first comprehensive publication of the university collections and museums under his leadership.

Lehmann worked as a visiting scholar at the University College and the Warburg Institute in London (1991/92), at the Archaeological Seminar at the University of Münster (2000–2002), at the Institute for Religious Studies at the University of Bremen (2002), and at the Winckelmann Institute at Humboldt University Berlin (2005), at the Weimar Classic and Art Collections Foundation (2005), at the Herzog August Library in Wolfenbüttel (2008) and at the Berlin State Museums(2011). In 2004 he was a professor at the Archaeological Institute of the Westphalian Wilhelms University in Münster. He managed the vacant professorship for Classical Archeology at the Martin Luther University Halle-Wittenberg from 2010 to 2012 and represented it in 2014 and 2016. In August 2018, he retired.

The main research areas of Lehmann's work are the imagery of Greek and Roman sculpture, the art and cultural history of ancient sport and its afterlife, ancient religious history, the cult topography of ancient sanctuaries with a focus on the imperial era and late antiquity as well as the reception of antiquity and the history of science.

Outside the field, Lehmann became known as a critic of an exhibition of the Winckelmann Society in Stendal, to which he had belonged since 1974. A bronze bust of Alexander the Great from the property of the antique dealer Robin Symes was shown there. According to the exhibition organizer Max Kunze, the portrait should be an ancient original and renew knowledge of the portrait of the Macedonian ruler. Lehmann denied the authenticity and assigned the bronze portrait to the forgery workshop of the Spanish master. Due to the nature of the allegations made in this context, Lehmann came into conflict with parts of the Winckelmann Society, which expelled him on December 12, 2009, at the society's general meeting. This was followed by a legal dispute between Max Kunze and the Winckelmann Society on the plaintiff's side and Stefan Lehmann as the defendant. In 2012, Lehmann made a public, written affidavit in which he regretted the as-conceived defamatory attacks against Kunze and the Winckelmann Society. On March 8, 2012, the Naumburg Higher Regional Court confirmed in the last instance the conviction of Stefan Lehmann for the omission of the allegations against Max Kunze and the Winckelmann Society. Nevertheless, the bust is a modern forgery of antiquities and an object of the illegal antiques trade.

An exhibition organized by Lehmann in Halle in 2014 "The wrong Augustus". A questionable bronze portrait of the first Roman emperor including a workshop, the results of which were published in 2015 under the title "Authenticity and Originality of Ancient Bronze Images", deepened the problem of falsification of ancient bronze images and offered exemplary solutions. This publication was also immediately noted by the international specialist community and, as the reviews can show, lively scientifically discussed. So far, there are no scientifically justified suggestions for correcting the suspicious "Alexander Stendal" within the specialist department, which does not apply equally to other bronze works listed as suspicious in the catalog.

== Works ==
- Mythologische Prachtreliefs. Dissertation. Universität Bonn 1988. Weiss, Bamberg 1996, ISBN 3-928591-80-0 (Studien zur Kunst der Antike und ihrem Nachleben. Band 1).
- with Andreas E. Furtwängler (ed.s): Alexander der Große – einst in Stendal: Original – Kopie – Fälschung? Halle (Saale) 2009, ISBN 978-3-941171-29-9 (Kataloge und Schriften des Archäologischen Museums der Martin-Luther-Universität. Band 2).
- with Ralph Einicke etc. (ed.s): Festschrift für Andreas E. Furtwängler. Zurück zum Gegenstand. 2 Bände. Beier & Beran, Langenweißbach 2009, ISBN 978-3-941171-16-9 (Schriften des Zentrums für Archäologie und Kulturgeschichte des Schwarzmeerraume. Band 16).
- with Katja Schneider (ed.s): Oskar Kokoschkas Antike. Eine europäische Vision der Moderne. Katalogbuch der Stiftung Moritzburg Halle. Kunstmuseum des Landes Sachsen-Anhalt, München 2010, ISBN 978-3-7774-2581-8.
