= Kryoneri Observatory =

Astronomical observatory in Greece

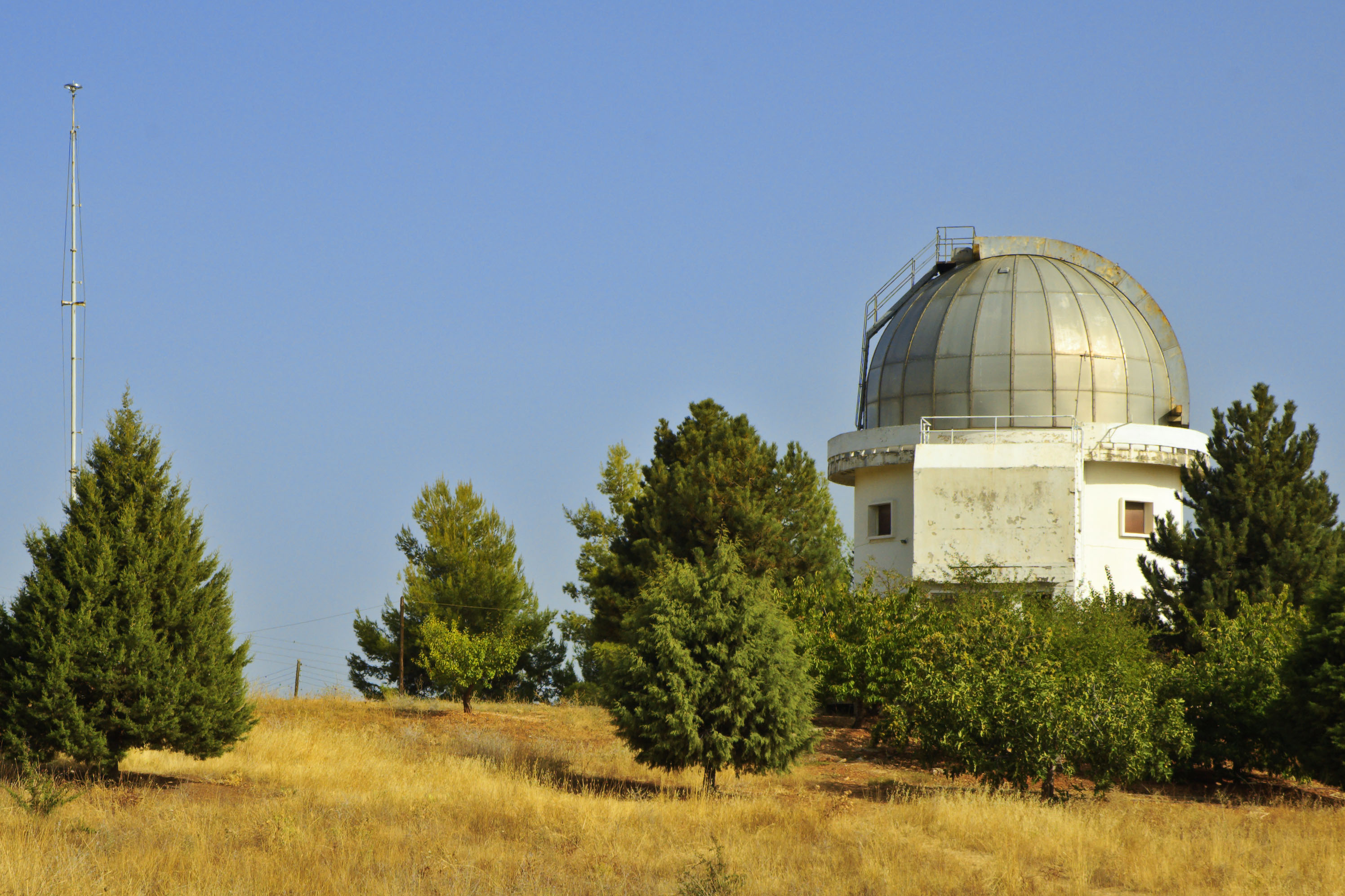
- The main dome of the observatory
- Alternative names: Kryoneri Astronomical Station
- Organization: Institute for Astronomy, Astrophysics, Space Applications and Remote Sensing of the National Observatory of Athens
- Observatory code: L10
- Location: Mount Kyllini, Greece
- Coordinates: 37°58′19″N 22°37′07″E
- Altitude: 930 metres (3,050 ft)
- Established: 1972
- Website: https://kryoneri.astro.noa.gr/en/

The Kryoneri Observatory (Greek: Αστεροσκοπείο Κρυονερίου), also known as the Kryoneri Astronomical Station (Αστρονομικός Σταθμός Κρυονερίου), is an astronomical observatory in Corinthia, Greece, operated by the IAASARS research institute of the National Observatory of Athens. It is home of one of the largest telescopes in Greece, a 1.23 metres (48 in) Cassegrain reflector, which was used for the NELIOTA project of ESA and NOA. The observatory is also housing smaller instruments that are conducting research for IAASARS and are participating in international programmes.

== History ==
The Kryoneri Observatory was established in 1972 and in 1975 its first telescope was installed, a 123 centimetres (48 in) Cassegrain reflector manufactured by Grubb Parsons, a British company based in Newcastle. The telescope was financed by the bequest of Marinos Korgialenios, a businessman and national benefactor of Greece who had bequested 200,000 drachmai to the National Observatory of Athens for the purchase of a large equatorial telescope in 1916. At that time the director of the Observatory was Demetrios Eginitis, a personal friend of Korgialenios and on whose request the bequest was given. However, the purchase of the telescope had to be postponed several times due to events like the First World War and the Greco-Turkish War. After the Second World War, Korgialenios' bequest had suffered considerable mutilation and the subsequent distress of the country led Stavros Plakidis, then director of the Οbservatory, to decide that such a purchase could not be made. Finally in 1971, 55 years after Korgialenios bequeathed to the Observatory, Demetrios Kotsakis submitted an application to the Government for 12,000,000 drachmai. So an essential increase of the bequest was effected permitting to start inquiries and discussions with a view to buy a telescope of 100 to 120 centimeters, and 4 years later a telescope was installed in the recently established Kryoneri Observatory. This telescope, which still is the main telescope of the observatory, came to be known as the Korgialenio telescope (Greek: Κοργιαλένειο Τηλεσκόπιο) and the observatory is sometimes referred to as the Korgialenios Astronomical Station of Kryoneri (Κοργιαλένειος Αστρονομικός Σταθμός Κρυονερίου).

In 2016, a major upgrade was conducted to the telescope by DFM Engineering, in order for it to be suitable for NELIOTA project. It included its conversion into a prime focus telescope, the replacement of some mechanical parts, the installation of a new control system, an increase of the automation of the dome and the installation of a new instrument.

Ten years later, in 2026, the observatory got its second large telescope, a Ritchey–Chrétien with an 80 centimetres (31 in) primary mirror. It is fully robotic and remotely operated, and is equipped with two imaging cameras and a filter wheel. The telescope is intended to support both astronomical research programs and Space Surveillance and Tracking applications. A separate building was constructed to house the telescope, which features a retractable roof that has been designed to close automatically in the event of adverse weather conditions.

== Location ==
The Kryoneri Observatory is located in the Corinthia regional unit of the Peloponnese. It was built on Mount Kyllini at an altitude of 930 meters above sea level. The closest settlement is Kryoneri and the observatory is named after it.

== Facilities ==
The Kryoneri Observatory consists of three buildings:

- The dome building, which hosts the main telescope, the telescope control room and the guest room
- The role-off building, which houses a smaller telescope
- The supporting power generators building

=== Korgialenio telescope ===
The Korgialenio telescope is one of the largest telescopes in Greece, with only the Aristarchos 2.3m Telescope in the Chelmos Observatory and the 1.3m Telescope in the Skinakas Observatory being larger in size. It is the main telescope of the Kryoneri Observatory and it was manufactured and installed by Grubb Parsons in 1975. It is a Cassegrain reflector with a 123 centimetres (48 in) parabolic primary mirror and a 31 centimetres (12 in) hyperbolic secondary mirror, both of which were created with Zerodur. Its mounting is based on a modified torque-tube equatorial system. The telescope was converted to a prime focus telescope by DFM Engineering in 2016 and its Prime Focus Instrument (PFI) was installed, which is able to provide the large field of view, making it suitable for the NELIOTA project. On the back of the Prime Focus Instrument there are two fast-frame sCMOS Andor Zyla 5.5 cameras offering the ability to record a target simultaneously in two different wavelength bands. The Instrument can also accommodate another option for imaging, hosting a "direct imaging" Apogee Aspen CCD where the light path is directed directly to the prime focus.

=== 80cm Ritchey–Chrétien telescope ===
The Ritchey–Chrétien telescope in the Kryoneri Observatory is fitted with an 80 centimetres (31 in) primary mirror and operates at a focal ratio of f/6.5. The design is featuring two Nasmyth foci and is mounted on an alt-azimuth mount. It is fully robotic and remotely operated, and is equipped with two imaging cameras and a filter wheel. The telescope is intended to support both Space Surveillance and Tracking applications and astronomical research programs. A separate building was constructed to house the telescope, which features a retractable roof that opens during observations and has been designed to close automatically in the event of adverse weather conditions, in order to protect the equipment. Both the telescope and the building were entirely funded by the Next Generation EU economic recovery package of the European Union to its member states after the COVID-19 pandemic. The telescope carried out its first test observations on 20 May 2026.

=== Laser communications ===
A high-power laser transmitter has been installed in the Kryoneri Observatry as part of NASA's Deep Space Optical Communications system, and it is the only one located in Europe. In collaboration with the nearby Aristarchos Telescope it achieved communication with the Psyche spacecraft in 2025.

=== Other instruments ===
The observatory is also housing a smaller telescope of the MAWFC Deep Sky Survey, which is located in a role-off building. Next to this building is one of the stations of the Very Wide Field of View (VWFOV) network, which is equipped with a sensor for detecting objects in Low Earth Orbit using Optical Triangulation. It was manufactured by Cilium Engineering and it was installed in November 2021.

== Projects ==
=== NELIOTA ===
The Near-Earth object Lunar Impacts and Optical TrAnsients (NELIOTA) was a research project funded by the European Space Agency from 2017 to 2023 and it aimed to determine the distribution and frequency of small near-earth objects by monitoring lunar impact flashes. For six and a half years the Korgialenio telescope was observing the Moon and detecting flashes on its surface which were caused by near-earth objects colliding with it. Apart from completing its main goal, it also became the largest study on asteroid collisions with the Moon since it was also detecting the size and the mass of the asteroids and the temperature created during the collision.

=== VWFOV network ===
The National Observatory of Athens has signed a memorandum of understanding with the Polish Space Agency for one of the stations of the Very Wide Field of View (VWFOV) network to be located in the Kryoneri Observatory; and for the IAASARS team to contribute to its operations. The station consists of a sensor developed by Cilium Engineering and it is designed to detect objects in Low Earth Orbit using the Optical Triangulation method. Out of the four such stations, three in Poland and one in Greece, the one at the Kryoneri Observatory was the first to be deployed with its completion occurring on 21 November 2021.

=== Manchester-Athens Wide-Field (Narrow-Band) Camera ===
The Manchester-Athens Wide-Field (Narrow-Band) Camera (WAWFC) is a Deep Sky Survey of the extensive line emission regions at high galactic latitudes. It is a joint project of the National Observatory of Athens and the Jodrell Bank Centre for Astrophysics of the Manchester University that aims to conduct a large-area sky survey with the aid of a customized camera and narrow-band filters properly designed for studying extended interstellar medium (ISM) structures in the optical emission lines of Ηα, [O III], and Hβ. The WAWFC building at the Kryoneri Observatory was completed on 1 November 2019.

=== Europlanet Telescope Network ===
The National Observatory of Athens had signed a memorandum of understanding with the Europlanet 2024 RI Consortium for the participation of the Kryoneri Observatory in the Europlanet Telescope Network, which was valid until 31 January 2024. As part of the program, the Korgialenio telescope detected lunar impact flashes during the Perseids meteor shower in 2023, using the instruments developed for the NELIOTA project. The results when then combined with the ones from NELIOTA.

=== ESOC satellite monitoring program ===
The Kryoneri Observatory is one of the observatories chosen by the European Space Operations Center of the European Space Agency for it to observe satellite movements. The goal is to monitor the orbits of satellites for what is known as planetary security, making sure that the chaotic situation occurring around Earth by the thousands of satellites is under control.

=== Laser communications ===
A high-power laser transmitter has been installed in the Kryoneri Observatory as part of the Deep Space Optical Communications system of NASA. On 7 July 2025, a high-powered laser was fired from the Kryoneri Observatory to the Psyche spacecraft, which then sent back a response to the Aristarchos Telescope in the nearby Chelmos Observatory. These two observatories in Greece are the only European ones participating in this laser communications demonstration, which is to be repeated on July 21, July 28 and August 4.
