= NELIOTA =

Astronomical research project

Near-Earth objects Lunar Impacts and Optical TrAnsients
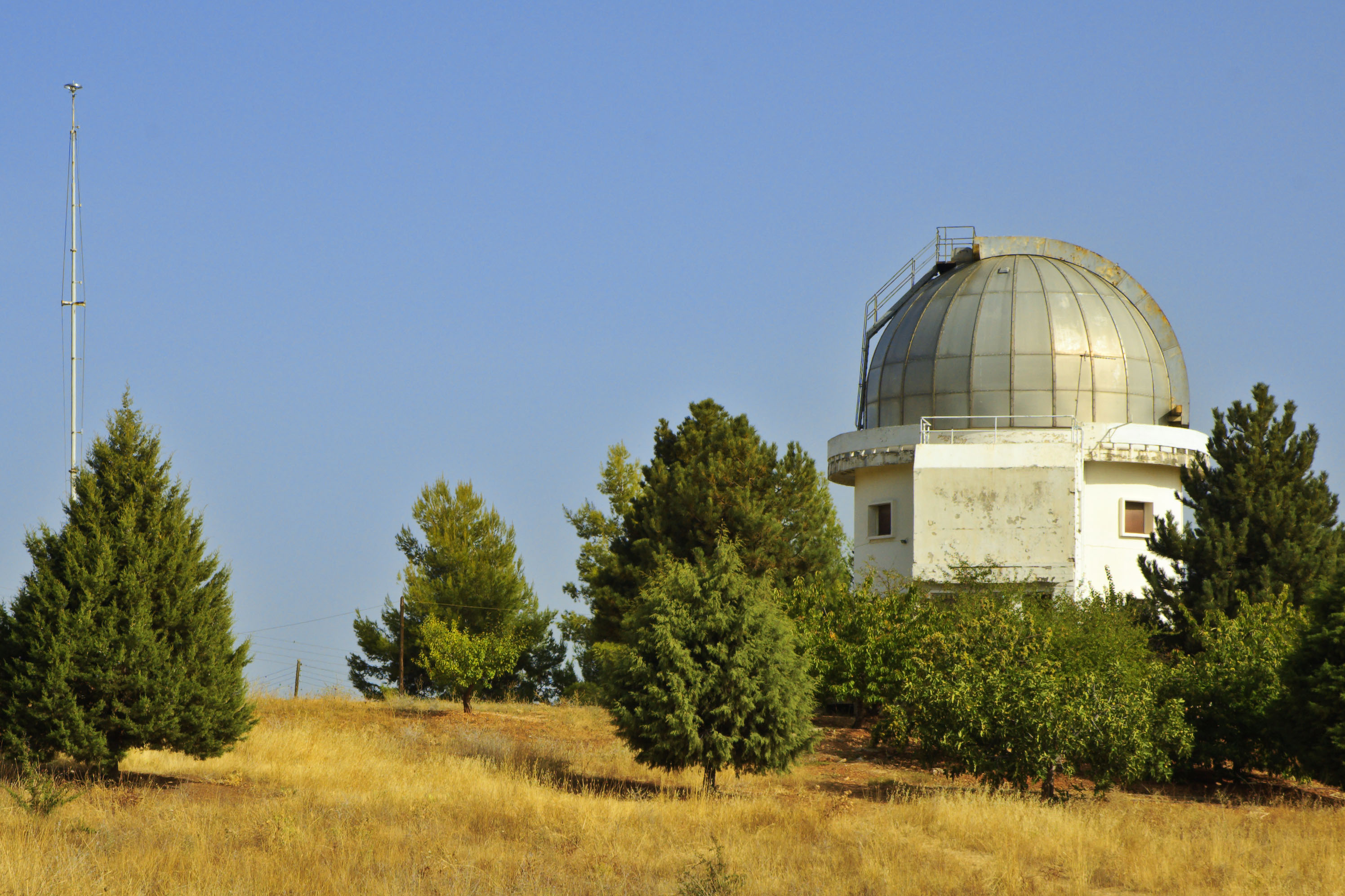
- The Kryoneri Observatory where the project took place
- Alternative names: NELIOTA
- Survey type: NEOs distribution and frequency study
- Target: Moon
- Organization: ESA, NOA
- Coordinates: 37°58′19″N 22°37′07″E
- Started: 2015, observations started February 2017
- Ended: August 2023
- Observations: 283.4 hours during 287 nights

Near-Earth object Lunar Impacts and Optical TrAnsients (NELIOTA) was a research project of the European Space Agency in collaboration with the National Observatory of Athens that aimed to determine the distribution and frequency of small near-earth objects by monitoring lunar impact flashes using a 1.23 m telescope in the Kryoneri Observatory.

The observations took place from 2017 to 2023. During these years, 192 lunar impact flashes were detected, and the size and mass of the asteroids were also measured, as well as the temperature during the collisions and the size of the craters created. As a result, apart from completing its main goal, it also became the largest study on asteroid collisions with the Moon.

== Hardware ==
=== Telescope ===
The NELIOTA project used a 1.23 meter Cassegrain type telescope located in the Kryoneri Observatory in southern Greece. The Korgialenio telescope, as it is often called, is a telescope manufactured in 1975 by Grubb Parsons and has a 123 centimetres (48 in) parabolic primary mirror and a 31 centimetres (12 in) hyperbolic secondary mirror, both of which are made with Zerodur. It received a major upgrade by DFM Engineering in May 2016 in order for it to be suitable for the NELIOTA project. It was converted into a prime focus telescope, some of its mechanical parts were replaced, the automation of its dome was increased, a new control system was installed and its Prime Focus Instrument (PFI) was installed.

=== Instrument ===
The 2016 upgrade of the telescope included the installation of the PFI, which is hosting a “direct imaging” Apogee Aspen CCD, where the light path is directed to the prime focus, and a dichroic beam splitter which directs the light into two fast-frame sCMOS cameras. The latter allows simultaneous observations in two different passbands, the R passband of visible light and I passband of near-infrared light (See: Photometric system), making NELIOTA the first system with the capability of detecting the temperature of asteroid collisions with the Moon.

== Results ==
Almost continuously from February 2017 to August 2023 the NELIOTA team observed the night side of the Moon during the lunar phases between the new moon and the first quarter and between the last quarter and the new moon, which would result in a total number of 678.5 observation hours (466 nights), though only 283.4 hours were used (287 nights). That happened because 52.1% of the total available time was lost due to bad weather conditions and 6.2% was lost due to technical issues.

During these hours 192 validated and 103 suspected lunar impact flashes were detected. The project included further measurements, which concluded that 75–80% of the meteoroids had a mass of less than 200 grams (0.44 lb) and a radius under 3 centimetres (1.2 in), while the craters produced by the collisions have a size of 1.5 to 3 meters (4.9 to 9.8 ft). NELIOTA also detected the temperature during the collisions and was the first and (as of October 2024) only system to have had this capability. About 85% of the collisions produced temperatures between 2000 and 4500 kelvin, which confirmed that they are relatively cool events. There wasn't any correlation found between the temperature and the size or the mass of the meteoroids. Moreover, for the multiframe lunar impact flashes in both pass bands, it was found that there is no unique behaviour after the observed maximum temperature, meaning that most of them exhibit a drop off after the peak. Many of them though presented a constant temperature or a slight increase in temperature. These results indicate that the melting and/or the complicated thermal processes of the plume probably play a significant role in the peak temperature and the thermal evolution in general.

The NELIOTA results were also used for the creation of an estimation of the probability of the potential impact of a meteoroid with a hypothetical infrastructure on the Moon or with a satellite. It was found out that small structures of less than 400 square metres (4,300 ft^{2}) have the tiny probability of 29 × 10^{−5} of being hit within a decade. However, larger structures or groups of structures that cover an area of about 8,000 square metres (86,000 ft^{2}) have a 0.9% probability of being hit in the extreme scenario, when both validated and suspected lunar impact flashes are taken into consideration. As for satellites in lunar orbit, CubeSats and Starlink sized spacecraft have extremely low probabilities of being hit, on the order of 10^{−7} for a 5 years mission duration. On the other hand, a larger ISS sized satellite that is in lunar orbit for longer periods of time has a probability of 1 to 2% of being hit. It should be clarified that these numbers were calculated only with the asteroids that have the physical properties that allowed them to be detected by the NELIOTA project, so objects like micrometeorites were not taken into consideration.

== Funding and operations ==
The NELIOTA project was funded by the European Space Agency with a special contract from 2015 to 2021, which included the upgrade of the 1.23 m telescope at the Kryoneri Observatory in 2016. This contract ended in January 2021 and the European Space Agency continued the funding in August 2021 via its Consolidating Activities Regarding Moon, Earth and NEOs (CARMEN) project, until July 2023. Additional observations were then made during the dates of the maximum activity of the Perseids meteor shower in 2023 (9-12 August), which were funded by the Europlanet 2024 RI as part of the participation of the Kryoneri Observatory in the Europlanet Telescope Network. The Europlanet 2024 RI had received funding from the European Union’s Horizon 2020 research and innovation program. The study was conducted in the Kryoneri Observatory, which is operated by the Institute for Astronomy, Astrophysics, Space Applications and Remote Sensing (IAASARS) of the National Observatory of Athens. The project is to continue if further funding is secured.
