= Leopard 2PL =

Main Battle Tank

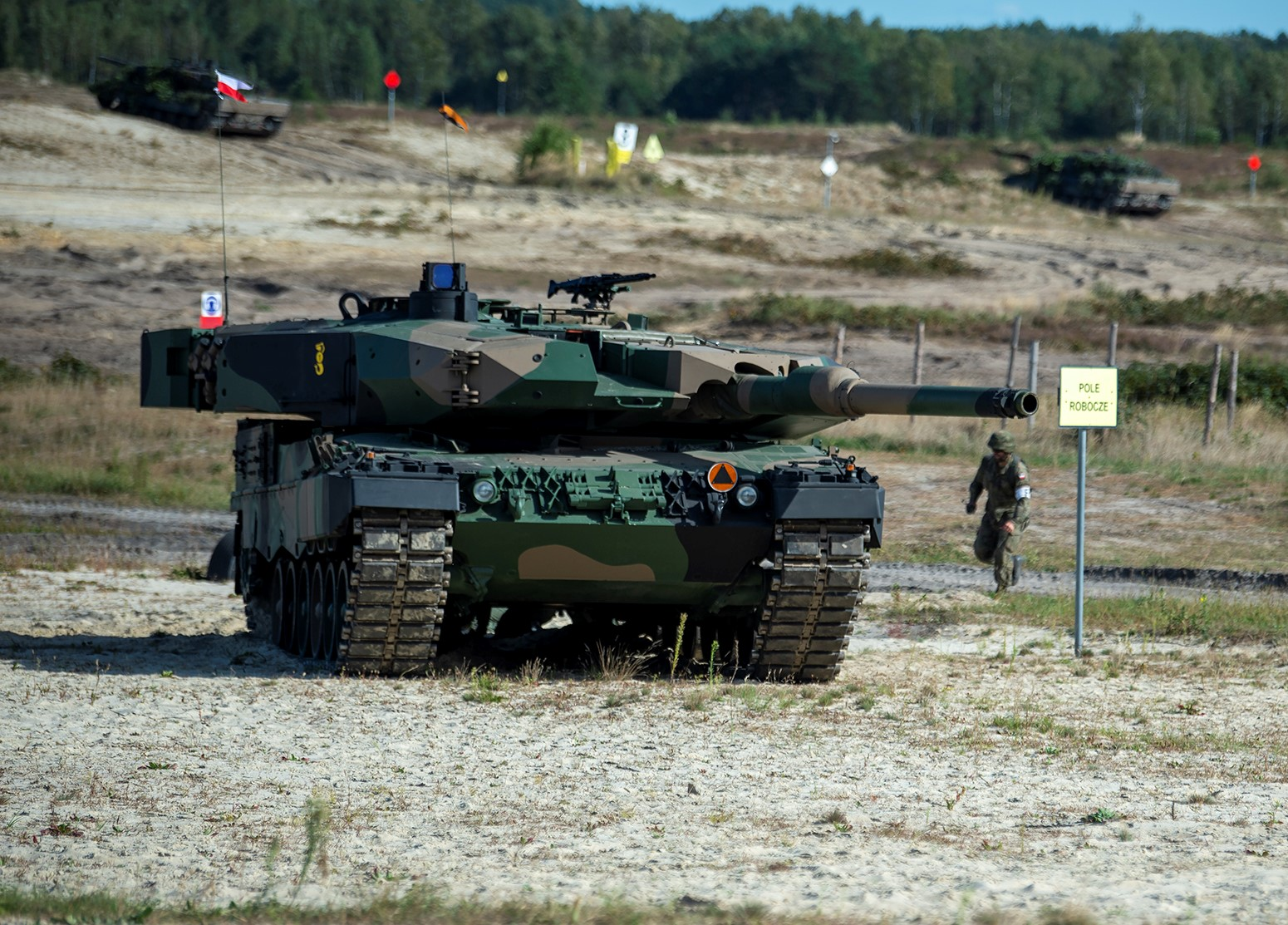
- Exercises of the soldiers of the 18th Mechanized Division 2020, Leopard 2PL tank
- Type: Main battle tank
- Place of origin: Germany / Poland

Service history
- In service: 2020–present
- Used by: Polish Land Forces
- Wars: Russo-Ukrainian War

Production history
- Designed: 2018
- Manufacturer: Zakłady Mechaniczne „BUMAR-ŁABĘDY” S.A, Rheinmetall
- Produced: 2019–present
- No. built: 115/142

Specifications
- Mass: 59,203 kg (130,520 lb)
- Length: 9,670 mm (381 in)
- Width: 3,750 mm (148 in)
- Height: 3,050 mm (120 in)
- Crew: 4
- Armor: Composite armor Turret fitted with AMAP modules
- Main armament: Rheinmetall Rh-120 L/44 120mm cannon
- Secondary armament: 2 × MG 3 machine guns
- Engine: MTU-MB 873; 1,100 kilowatts (1,500 PS)
- Operational range: on road 500 kilometres (310 mi), in terrain 300 kilometres (190 mi)
- Maximum speed: 68 kilometres per hour (42 mph)

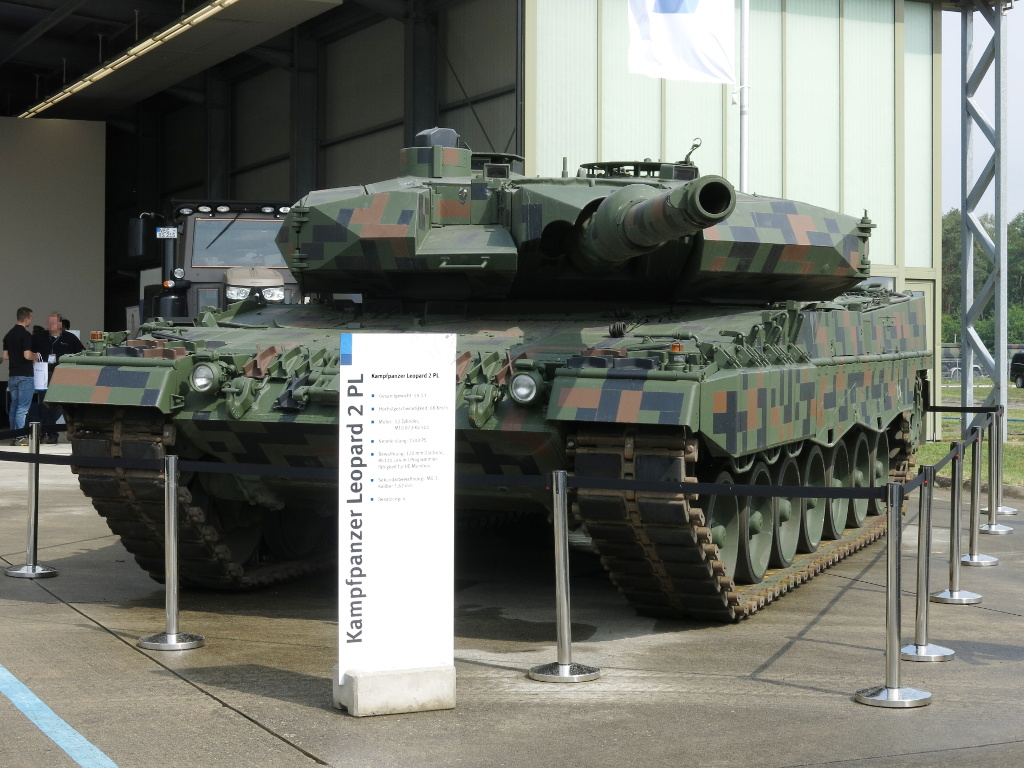
Leopard 2PL prototype on German Army Day, Fassberg Air Base 2019

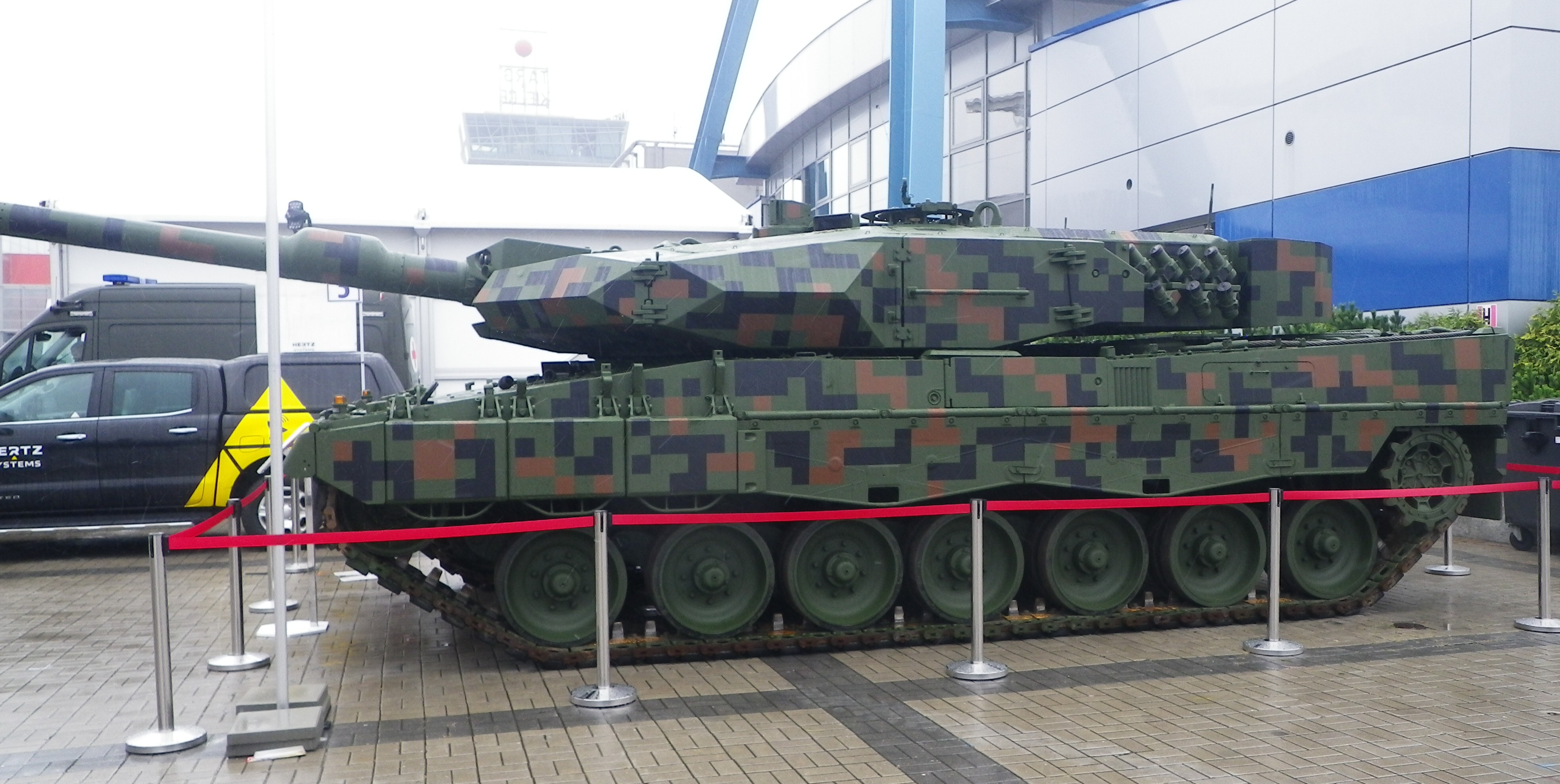
Leopard 2PL side view

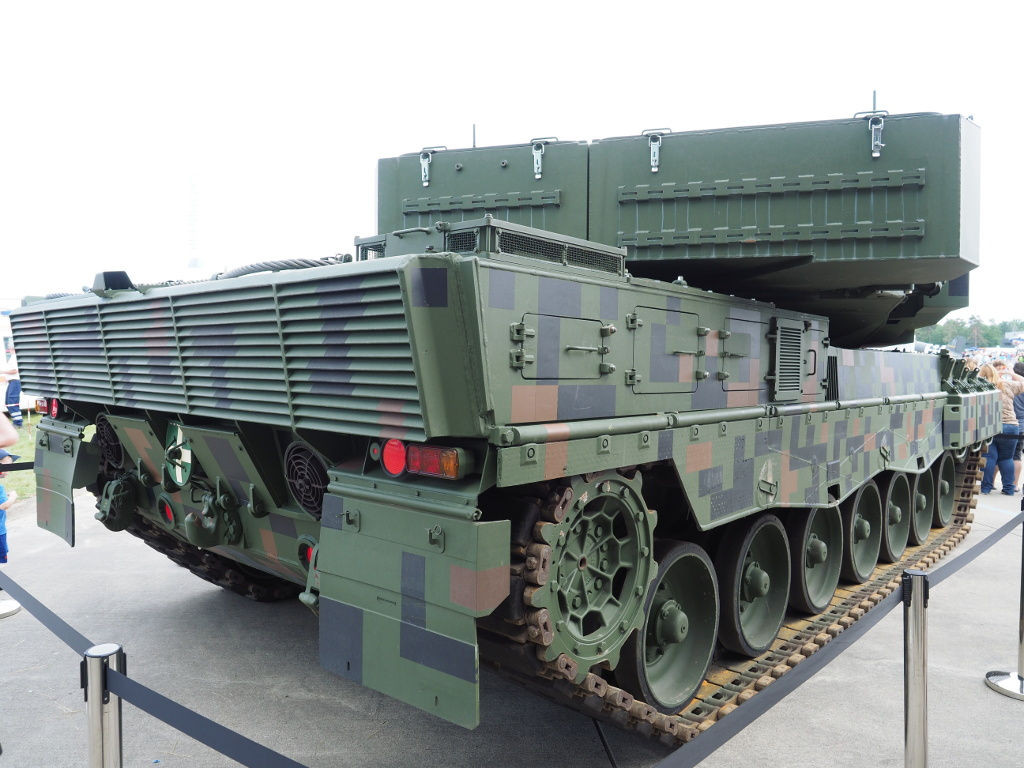
Leopard 2PL rear view

The Leopard 2PL is a main battle tank used by the Polish Armed Forces, and is a modernized version of the older Leopard 2A4 tank, phased out by Germany and first acquired by Poland in the 2000s. The modernisation is currently being carried out in cooperation with Rheinmetall and the Polish Armaments Group (Polish: Polska Grupa Zbrojeniowa PGZ).

== History ==
As soon as the Polish Land Forces took over the first Leopard 2A4 tanks from the Bundeswehr in 2002, it was recognized that their modernization was necessary. However, the first efforts to develop its plan and scope did not begin until mid-2012.

The program was called Leopard 2PL and as a result of the conducted works, two variants of modernization were defined. The basic one included the introduction of an electric turret drive and gun stabilization (in place of hydraulic one), installation of an auxiliary power unit (APU), modernization of the optoelectronic system through e.g. installation of new thermal imaging cameras, modernization of the driver's seat and a new anti-explosion, fire and mine protection package. The second variant was extended to also include a BMS combat management system, installation of a remote-controlled weapon stations on the turret of the tank, new types of ammunition, air conditioning systems in the driver and combat compartment, and modernization of the electronics cooling system.

Finally, the modernization program was included in the "Technical Modernization Plan of the Polish Armed Forces for 2013-2022" (Plan Modernizacji Technicznej) in December 2012. In early March 2013, invitations were sent to interested parties for the technical dialogue, which took place from March to August.

In October 2013, a tender was announced to select a contractor for the program. Three consortia formed to bid:

1. Wojskowe Zakłady Motoryzacyjne from Poznań, Wojskowe Zakłady Łączności Nr. 2 and Rheinmetall Landsysteme GmbH,
2. PCO and ASELSAN Elektronik,
3. Bumar-Łabędy, OBRUM company and Polski Holding Obronny (PHO).

The final offer was submitted by the third consortium and negotiations with the Inspectorate of Armaments began. In December 2014, the consortium submitted the final proposal based on the solutions of their foreign partner Krauss-Maffei Wegmann, but in 2015 the procedure to select the contractor was terminated due to formal deficiencies and the low participation of Polish industry in the program.

That same year, the decision was made to contract the modernization to the Polish Armaments Group (owner of Bumar-Łabędy and OBRUM). The final offer was made in November 2015, thus starting negotiations.

On December 28, 2015, an agreement was signed between the Inspectorate of Armaments (Inspektorat Uzbrojenia) and a consortium consisting of PGZ and Bumar-Łabędy for the modernization of 128 Leopard 2 tanks with an option for another 14 units. The German partner of the consortium was the German company Rheinmetall Landsysteme, which in the past co-produced Leopard 2 tanks. The contract amount was 2.415 billion PLN. On June 20, 2018, an annex was signed using the option to upgrade 14 tanks, i.e. all Leopard 2A4 tanks used by the Army. The cost of the contract increased to 2.721 billion PLN. The contract originally assumed that all copies of the base order would be transferred by 2020 and those from options for 14 vehicles by 2021.

The original work schedule assumed that the entire work process would be divided into five stages. In the first stage for 2016, preparation of all infrastructure and resources needed for modernization were anticipated. The second stage predicted that from November 2016 to the end of 2017, dismantling of the machines and preparation for the modernization process would be carried out, while in the third stage, falling in 2018, technology transfer and staff training on a trial batch of tanks. From June 2018 to March 2019, the process of starting production and delivery of the pre-series machine to the recipient was to begin, and the last fifth stage lasting from January 2019 to November 2020 was to begin serial modernization of machines and deliveries (only vehicles from the first contract, i.e. 128 pieces). However, the original modernization process envisaged that the prototype in the number of one piece would be delivered by the third quarter of 2018, the test batch of 5 vehicles (the process of training Polish specialists and technology transfer) made in Germany would be delivered by the end of 2018, the test batch comprising 12 vehicles already completed in Poland, it will be delivered by the end of the first quarter of 2019, and serial production of the other machines under the basic contract is to be carried out from the second quarter of 2019 to the third quarter of 2020.

On February 18, 2016, a detailed agreement was signed with a German partner, which specified the terms of cooperation between ZM Bumar-Łabędy and Rheinmetall. The contract assumed that the German company would be responsible for developing the tank modernization project, preparing the necessary technical documentation together with Polish partners, making a prototype of the 2PL version car and tanks of the trial batch (five of which includes the process of training Polish specialists and technology transfer to Poland), providing ZM Bumar-Łabędy with the necessary technical support in starting production of serial wagons, providing necessary tools and transferring know-how technology. During the Eurosatory 2018 trade fair, representatives of Rheinmetall announced the completion of factory tests of the Leopard 2PL prototype tank.

In August 2018, the vehicle was sent to the Military Armored and Automotive Institute in Sulejówek, where it underwent further national tests in Poland. In 2018, Reinmetall handed over to ZM Bumar-Łabędy the first pre-series copies, which opened the way to the modernization of machines already in Poland, after the positive completion of testing the prototype vehicle. The prototype tests were prolonged, which influenced the modernization of further copies and their delivery to the recipient. During the prototype testing there were also problems with the chassis, the repair of which prolonged the testing process, which meant that serial production could not be started.

The prototype was completed on May 8, 2020. On May 28, 2020, the Polish Land Forces received the first copies from the pre-series party. The contract was extended until the end of July 2023.

The contract was annexed five times, mainly due to not taking into account the restoration of efficiency of some tank elements, which turned out to be necessary and the different state of wear of individual vehicles. The final cost of the program increased to 3.29 billion PLN.

== Description ==
Leopard 2PL is a third generation main battle tank, made in cooperation with Polish Armaments Group and Rheinmetall Landsystems. The tank is designed to master and maintain the area, and support fire from deck weapons of mechanized and motorized subunits, in all weather conditions, both during the day and at night.

As a result of the work, two versions of the vehicles were developed: the Leopard 2PL version, which is currently supplied to the military, and the Leopard 2PLM1, which was created by decision in 2018. The German partner is responsible for the production of the prototype variant of the Leopard 2PLM1. The vehicle was delivered in January 2021, and its tests began in February 2021.

The differences in the field of tanks in the Leopard 2PL and Leopard 2PM1 versions are that the machines in the 2PLM1 version are equipped with an EGPT compartment warning system, a system protecting the network electronics against the start-up time, modification operating modes of the laser rangefinder, an additional socket for batteries and the PIX combination, allows the commander to automatically rotate the optoelectronic head of the PERI observation and aiming device to the "six o'clock" and "twelve o'clock" position relative to the tank's hull.

=== Armor ===
The modernization of the Leopard 2A4 to the 2PL standard includes the strengthening of the ballistic resistance of the turret to a level exceeding that of the Leopard 2A5 version. Additional external armor modules are mounted around the vehicle turret. It was not decided to reinforce the hull and vehicle chassis due to the significant increase in vehicle weight and cost reduction. Special anti-spall liners have been installed inside the vehicle to protect the crew inside the vehicle against splashes and armor fragments in the event of a puncture or hit.

=== Armament ===
The main armament of the tank remained the Rheinmetall Rh-120 smoothbore gun in the L/44 version, but it was modified to adapt to the use of new types of ammunition, i.e. DM63 armor-piercing shell and programmable DM11 ammunition. Left and right resistors, return, recoil indicator and container for shell bottom were replaced, in order to use DM11 ammunition, a programming system was introduced in the cannon's falling-block action, as well as a fire control system and electronic cannon trigger assembly. A new on-board computer was installed with new ballistic tables. MG-3 machine guns were not exchanged for another model. The two plane gun stabilizer system of the cannon and turret drives were changed from hydraulic to purely electric.

=== Optics ===
The gunner's sight and sights of the gunner and the commander were modernized by adding Polish thermal imaging cameras of the third generation KLW-1 Asteria made by Polish PCO. Driver awareness was improved by installing a KDN-1 Nyks day / night reversing camera also PCO production. A monitor-control panel for the commander was installed, which enables alternative image transmission from the modernized EMES 15 sight and PERI R17A3L4 CP instrument, performing a full test of tower systems in cooperation with the modernized RPP testing block and control of tower systems from the level of the commander, which allows operation in hunter-killer mode.

=== Communication ===
A new, digital communication bus was used. The radio has not been replaced with a modern model.

=== Other ===
Tank propulsion units were subjected to general repairs, an auxiliary power unit (APU) with a power of 17 kW was installed, in addition to the installation of anti-shrapnel liners, crew safety was improved by the use of an explosion-proof system with cylinders with Deugen-N extinguishing agent and the fire system was modernized by adding a new control panel and cylinders with extinguishing agent, additional transport baskets were mounted outside the turret and adaptation of the evacuation equipment to the tank combat weight increased to 60 tons.

== Service in Polish Land Forces ==
The first Leopard 2PL tanks were delivered to Polish Army in May 2020. The first six vehicles were delivered to the Leopard Training Center (Ośrodek Szkolenia Leopard) in Świętoszów from 10th Armoured Cavalry Brigade (10 Brygada Kawalerii Pancernej), with a further two tanks being delivered to 1st Warsaw Armoured Brigade (Warszawska Brygada Pancerna) in Wesoła in September 2020. By the end of 2020, 12 Leopard 2PL tanks were delivered to the army. During December of 2021 the 1st Armored Brigade was the first unit to have a full company (14 tanks) of the Leopard 2PL, with the final two tanks being delivered that month. Previously, the unit had a tank company in the Leopard 2A4 version of the 1st Tank Battalion. This brought the total number of machines delivered to the Polish Armed forces to 20.

By December 2024, 76 of the modernised Leopard 2PL tanks had been delivered to Poland.
