= KjPn 8 =

Bipolar planetary nebula in the constellation Cassiopeia

Emission nebula
- Planetary nebula
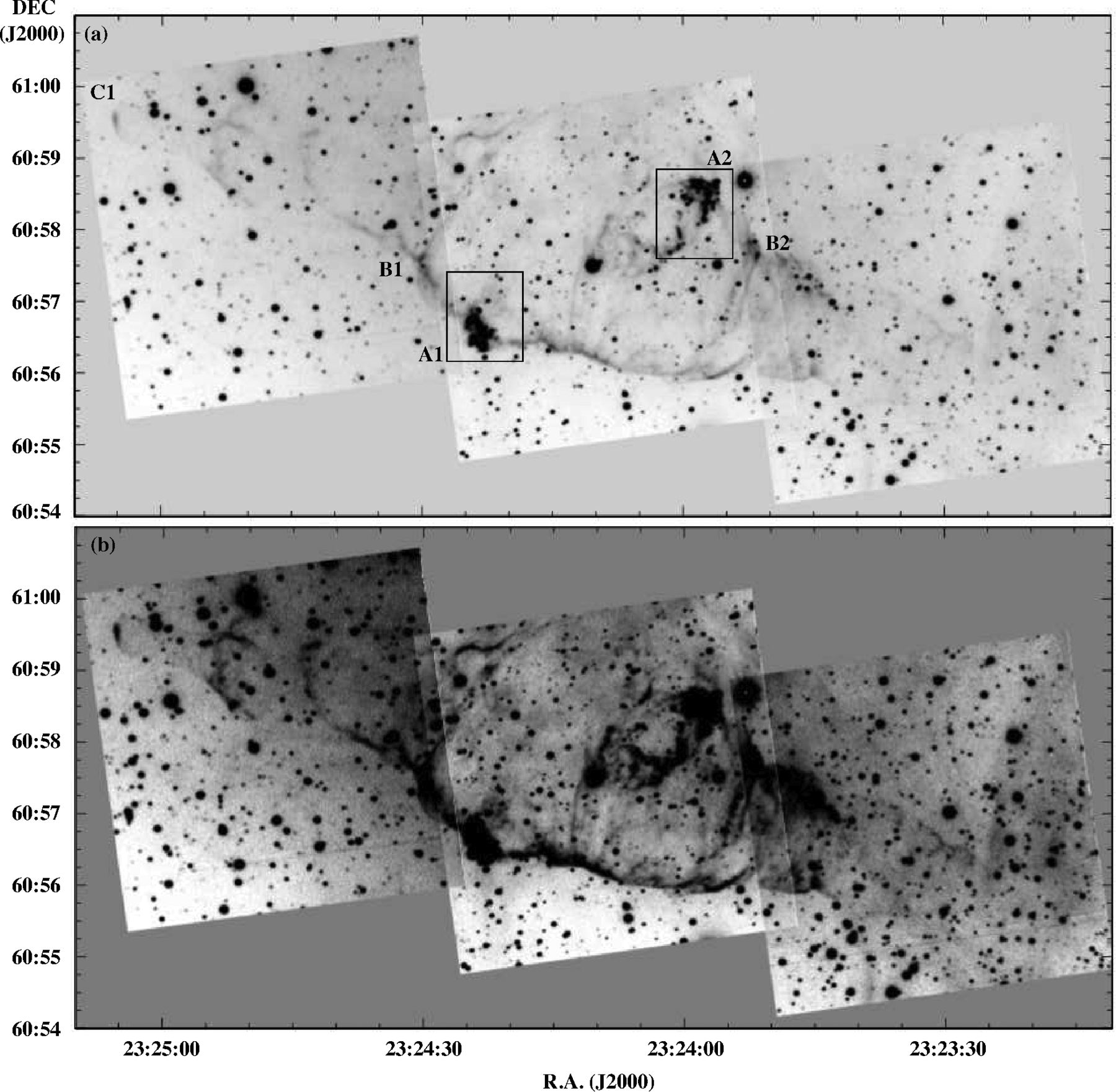
- Two mosaic images of KjPn 8 made with the Aristarchos 2.3 m Telescope. The upper image shows Hα emission, and the lower image shows [NII] (ionized Nitrogen) emission. This is a negative image.

Observation data: J2000 epoch
- Right ascension: 23^{h} 24^{m} 10.472^{s}
- Declination: 60° 57′ 30.75″
- Distance: 1600±230 pc
- Constellation: Cassiopeia
- Designations: PN G112.5200.1; K 3-89

KjPn 8 is a bipolar planetary nebula which was discovered by M.A. Kazaryan and Eh. S. Parsamyan in 1971 and independently by Luboš Kohoutek in 1972.

Very little was published about this nebula until 1995, when it was realized that KjPn 8 sits in the center of a very large filamentary nebula, 14 by 4 arc minutes in size. This is the largest known bipolar structure associated with a planetary nebula. Narrow band images centered at Hα and forbidden line transitions of nitrogen, sulphur, and oxygen reveal pairs of bow shocks at differing position angles, indicating the presence of episodic ejection of material along a precessing jet, similar to what is seen in Fleming 1, but much larger (in angular extent). The physical size of this extended nebula is approximately 4.1 by 1.2 parsecs, much larger than a typical planetary nebula, while the core nebula known prior to 1995 is only about 0.2 parsecs in diameter.

The envelope of KjPn 8 is expanding rapidly enough to allow the proper motion of features in the nebula to be measured. In 1997 John Meaburn compared images of the nebula taken in 1954 (as part of the Palomar Sky Survey) and 1991.He measured a proper motion of 34±3 milliarcseconds per year for two knots in the nebula. Combining this proper motion with an expansion velocity derived from spectral line profile widths allowed Meaburn to derive a distance to the nebula of 1600±230 parsecs, and a kinematic age of 3400±300 years.

Microwave emission from carbon monoxide reveals the presence of a dense disk of molecular gas 30 arcseconds in diameter expanding at about 7 km/sec, with a mass ≥ 0.03 M_{☉}. The disk is aligned with the youngest and fastest bipolar jet, which has an expansion velocity of about 300 km/sec. The central star has begun to ionize the central region of this disk.

Hubble Space Telescope observations suggest that KjPn 8 might be a very rare object, formed by a binary system in which both stars had similar masses, which reached the end of the Asymptotic Giant Branch phase within 10 to 20 thousand years of each other, and entered the planetary nebula formation stage nearly simultaneously.
