= Aristarchos 2.3 m Telescope =

Astronomical telescope in Greece

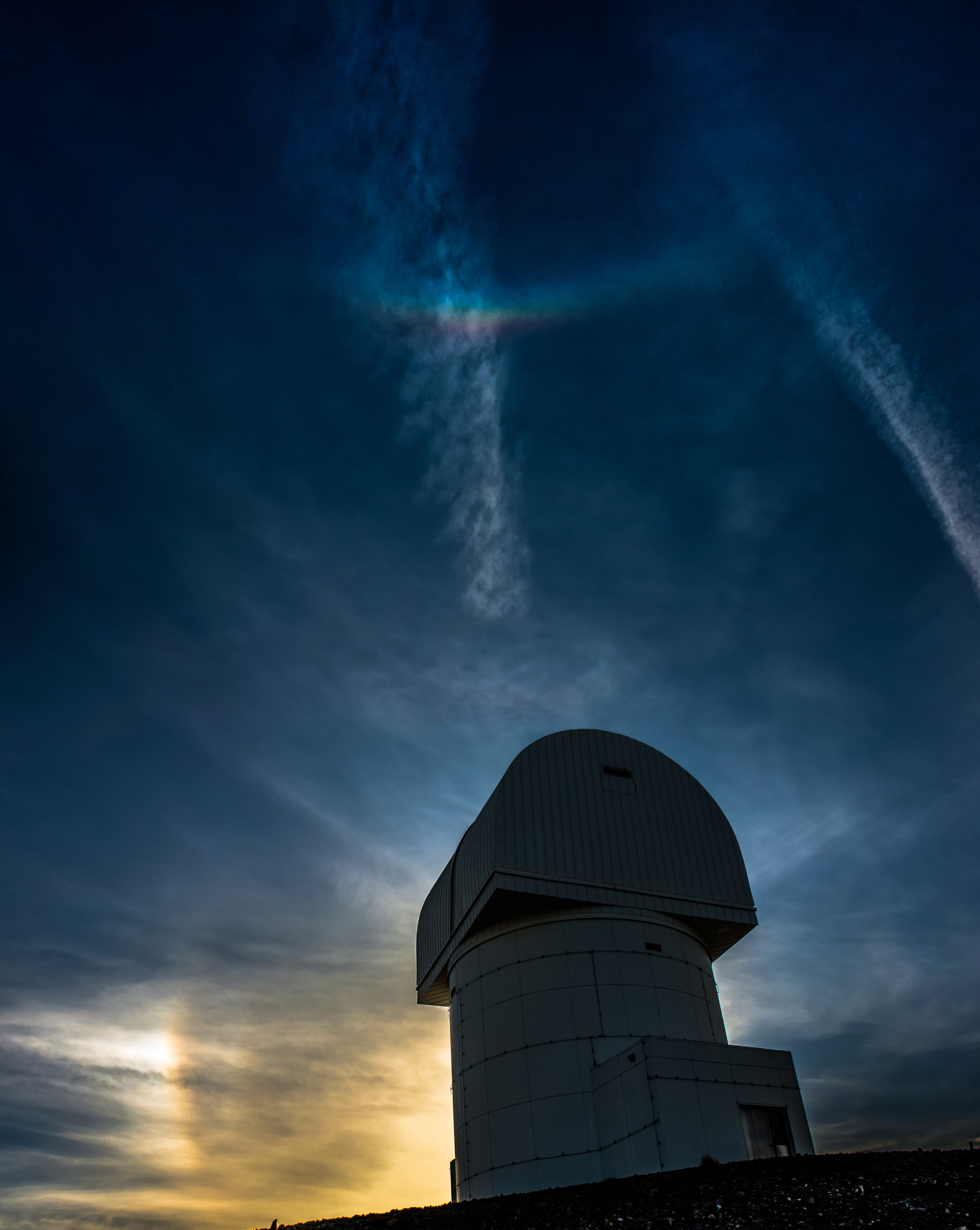
- Location(s): Kalavryta Municipality, Achaea, Western Greece, Decentralized Administration of Peloponnese, Greece
- Coordinates: 37°59′08″N 22°11′54″E
- Altitude: 2340 meters
- Diameter: 2.3 m (7 ft 7 in)
- Website: helmos.astro.noa.gr
- Location of Aristarchos 2.3 m Telescope
- Related media on Commons

The Aristarchos 2.3 m Telescope is a Ritchey-Chrétien telescope at the Chelmos Observatory on Mount Chelmos, Greece. It is the largest telescope in the country and it had its first light test in 2005. It is operated by the Institute for Astronomy, Astrophysics, Space Applications and Remote Sensing of the National Observatory of Athens.

== History ==
The New Greek Telescope project of the National Observatory of Athens (NOA) was funded by the European Commission and the General Secretariat for Research and Technology of the Hellenic Ministry of Development. The telescope had its first light test in 2005, and became the largest telescope in Greece when it became fully operational at the Chelmos Observatory site in 2007. The telescope is operated by the Institute for Astronomy, Astrophysics, Space Applications and Remote Sensing (IAASARS) of the NOA. It is the largest telescope located in the Balkans and the second largest in mainland Europe.

== Design ==
The telescope, built by Carl Zeiss AG, has a Ritchey-Chrétien configuration with a primary mirror with a diameter of 2.3 m. At the main f/8 Cassegrain focus, the corrected field of view is approximately one degree, with a plate scale of 1.17 arcsec/mm. It has an Altazimuth mount. The telescope is housed in a tower 35 meters away from the control building, so that heat and vibrations from human activity, automobiles and computers will not affect the telescope's performance. It was designed to support remote observation.

== Research ==
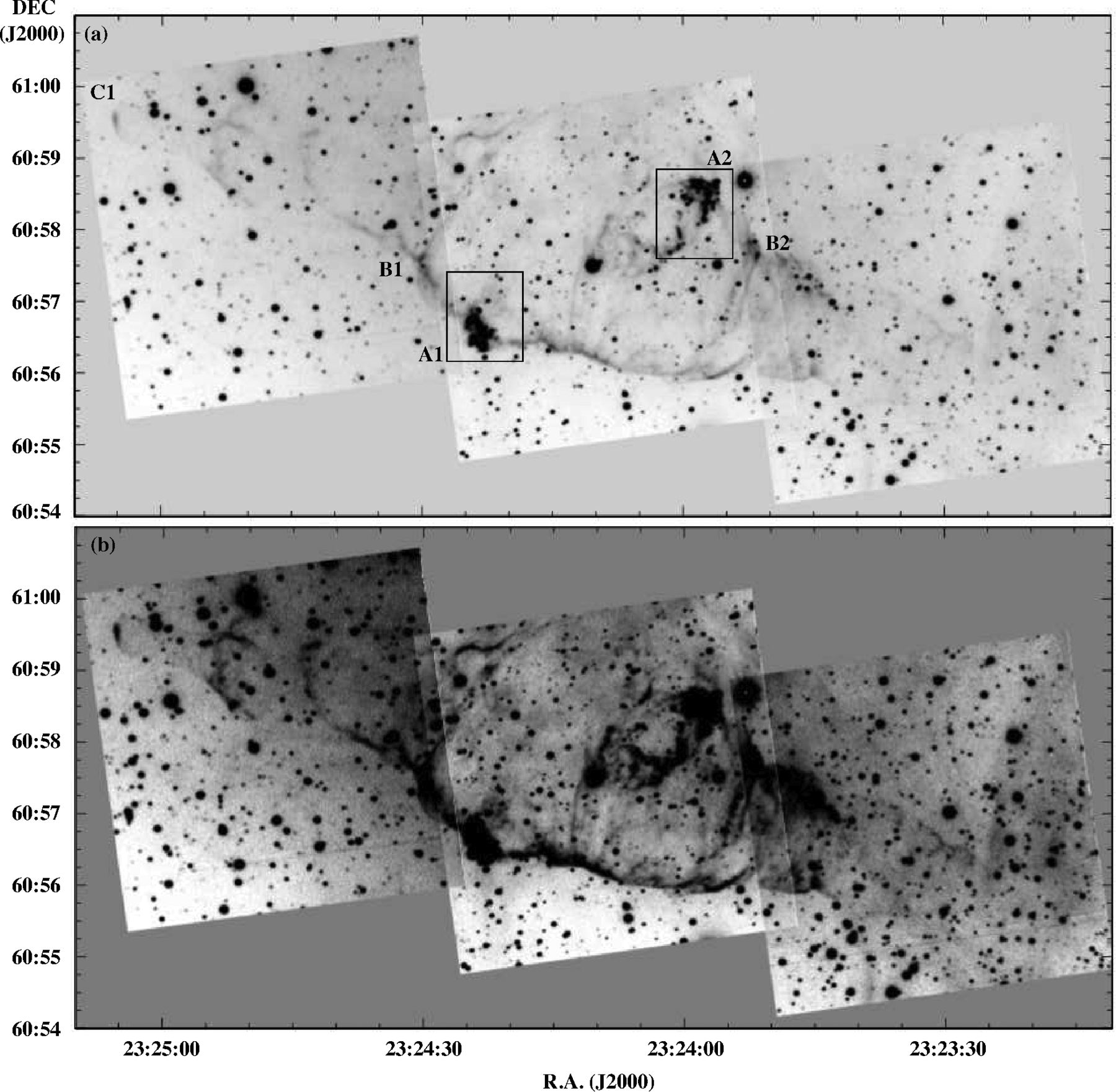
Mosaic images of nebula KjPn 8 made with the Aristarchos telescope

=== OPTICON-RadioNet ===
The Aristarchos telescope is a full member of the OPTICON-Radionet Pilot (ORP) project since January 1, 2016. ORP is funded by the European Union and its main goal is to promote cooperation between experts from the astronomy community. It is the largest and most comprehensive network of facilities and observatories across Europe. The Aristarchos telescope has made quite a few observations under ORP awarded time, like a stellar occultation of Neptune's moon Triton and a transit of exoplanet WASP-12b.

=== Space communications ===
All the activities concerning optical, quantum, and deep space communications carried out at the Chelmos Observatory are identified by project HOTSPOT.

The Aristarchos telescope was selected in August 2020 as the first ground-based station of the ScyLight program of ESA. ScyLight supports the research, development and evolution of optical communication, photonics and quantum communication technologies, and provides flight opportunities for their in-orbit verification. On 23 July 2021, the installation of the equipment for the project was completed; and a test was successfully performed for cummunication with the Alphasat satellite.

The Aristarchos telescope was also selected for another project, the Deep Space Optical Communications (DSOC) demonstration of NASA. On 7 July 2025, the telescope achieved laser communication with the Psyche spacecraft while it was on its way to the main asteroid belt. A high-powered laser was fired from the nearby Kryoneri Observatory and the Aristarchos telescope received the spacecraft's response. These two observatories were the only ones in Europe participating in this experiment. The Aristarchos telescope will communicate with Psyche again on 21 July, 28 July and 4 August.

=== Other studies ===
The Aristarchos telescope has been operating for many years and has made multiple contributions to science. Just to name a few, in 2013 it helped discover the exoplanets WASP-113b and WASP-114b, and in 2022 it proved that 55 asteroids believed to belong to a 4 Gyr collisional family share a common origin and thus do form a collisional family. Another contribution of the telescope is that it has provided a measurement of the distance to the planetary nebula KjPn 8.

== See also ==
- List of largest optical reflecting telescopes
