= SCMOS =

Camera technology

sCMOS (scientific Complementary Metal–Oxide–Semiconductor) are a type of CMOS image sensor (CIS). These sensors are commonly used as components in specific observational scientific instruments, such as microscopes and telescopes. sCMOS image sensors offer extremely low noise, rapid frame rates, wide dynamic range, high quantum efficiency, high resolution, and a large field of view simultaneously in one image.

The sCMOS technology was launched in 2009 during the Laser World of Photonics fair in Munich. The companies Andor Technology, Fairchild Imaging and PCO Imaging developed the technology for image sensors as joint venture.

== Technical details ==
Prior to the introduction of the technology, scientists were limited to using either CCD or EMCCD cameras, both of which had their own set of technical limitations. While back-illuminated electron-multiplying CCD (EMCCD) cameras are optimal for purposes requiring the lowest noise and dark currents, sCMOS technology's higher pixel count and lower cost result in its use in a wide range of precision applications. sCMOS devices can capture data in a global-shutter “snapshot” mode over all the pixels or rectangular subsets of pixels, and can also operate in a rolling-shutter mode.

The cameras are available with a monochrome sCMOS image sensors or with RGB sCMOS image sensors. With sCMOS, digital information for each frame is generated rapidly and with an improved low-light image quality. The latest sCMOS sensors provide low enough noise and do not benefit considerably from lower temperatures as it was with CCDs, allowing researchers to scan across a sample and capture high-quality images.

Some disadvantages at this time, (2023), with sCMOS cameras versus related technologies are:

- sCMOS sensors tend be more expensive than traditional CMOS sensors.
- sCMOS sensors have a limited resolution compared to other types of sensors like CCD.

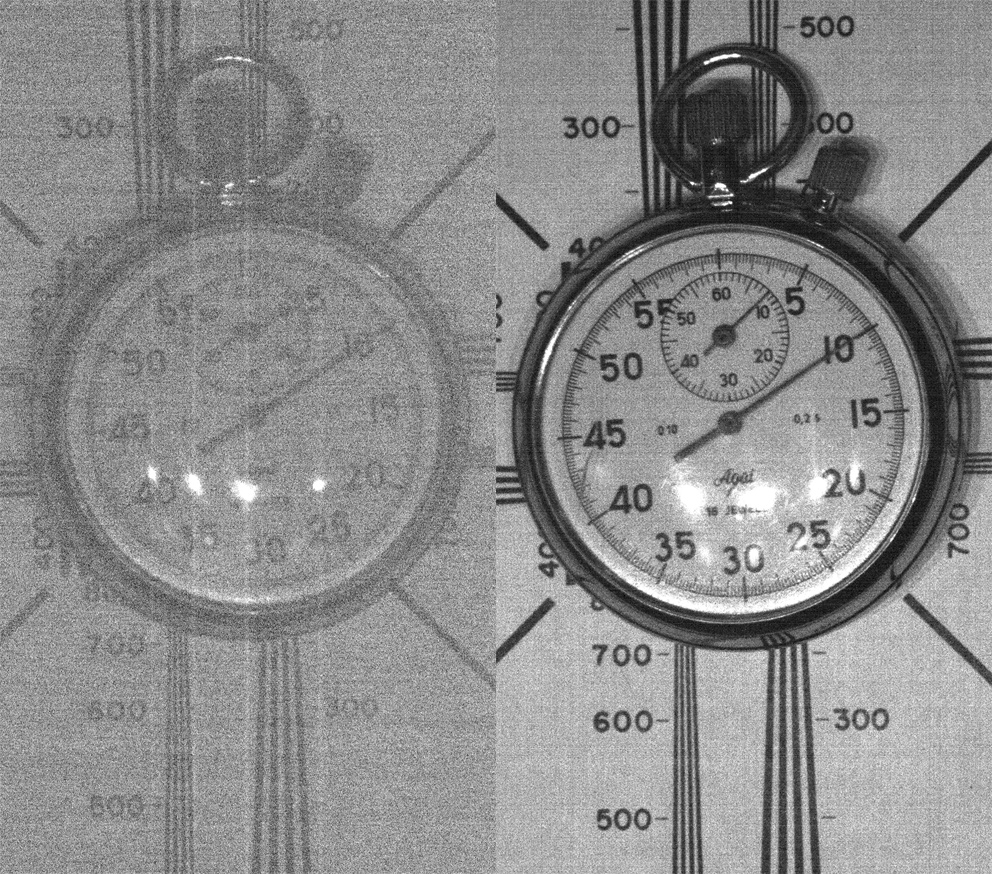
Comparison - CCD vs. sCMOS technology; lower figure compares a scientific grade CCD (left) and a pco.edge camera with sCMOS sensor (on the right) under similar weak illumination conditions. This demonstrates the superiority of sCMOS over CCD with regards to read out noise and dynamic, without smear (the vertical lines in the CCD image).

== In practice ==
The New York University School of Medicine uses sCMOS cameras for their research. They were used to study biological molecules and processes in real-time at nanometer scale. Such cameras were also in use in astronomy and microscopy.

== See also ==
- Active pixel sensor
- Beyond CMOS
- MOSFET
- CMOS amplifiers
