= Fleming 1 =

Planetary nebula in the constellation Centaurus

Emission nebula
- Planetary nebula
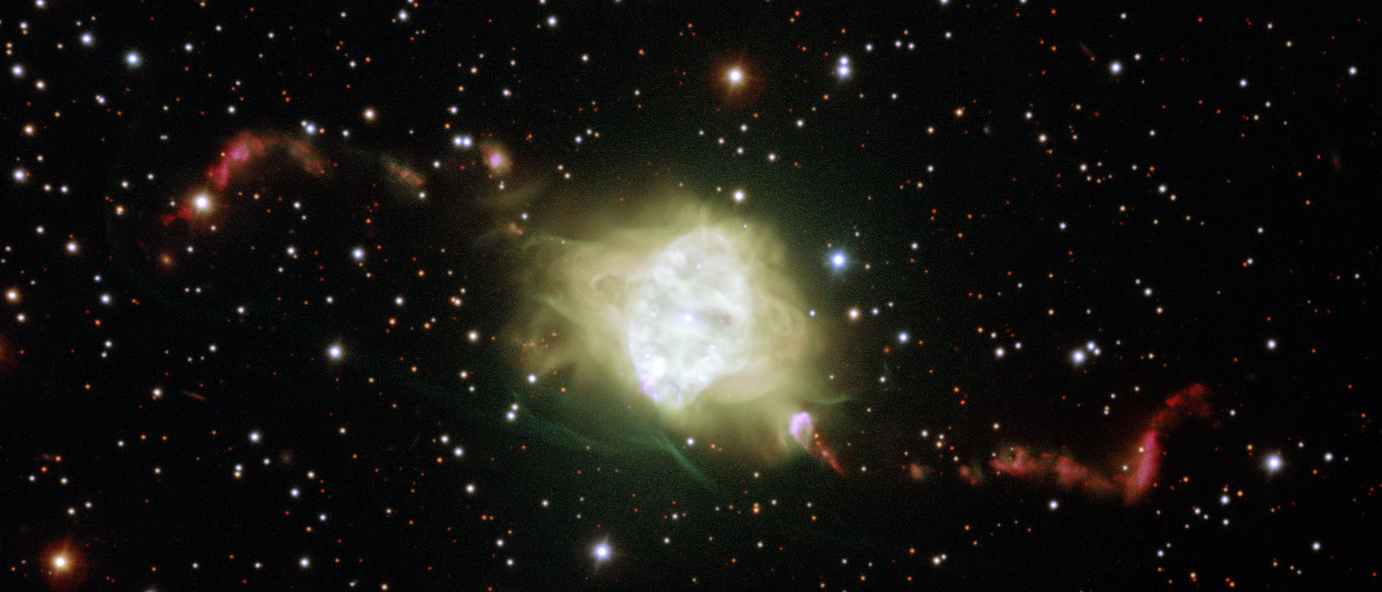
- Fleming 1 as seen by ESO

Observation data: J2000 epoch
- Right ascension: 11^{h} 28^{m} 36.20^{s}
- Declination: −52° 56′ 04.50″
- Distance: 2,400 pc ly
- Apparent magnitude (V): +7.6
- Apparent dimensions (V): 1.3′ × 0.5′ (central part)
- Constellation: Centaurus

Physical characteristics
- Radius: 1.4 pc ly
- Absolute magnitude (V): 13.1
- Notable features: A peculiar PN with a binary in the center
- Designations: G290.5+07.9, ESO 170-6

Fleming 1 is an unusual planetary nebula situated in the constellation Centaurus. It has a pair of symmetrical jets spanning more than 2.8 pc and delineated with a number of knots. The jets and knots are moving away from the center of the nebula and were probably ejected 10,000 to 16,000 years ago. The innermost part of the nebula has a butterfly shape and is immersed into a faint halo. The butterfly's wings point in the direction of jets with their axis titled by 50° to the line of sight. The waist of the "butterfly" is surrounded by a torus of expanding hot gas forming the inner bright ellipse. Fleming 1 is probably 5,000 years old.

Like any other planetary nebula, Fleming 1 was formed when an old asymptotic giant branch (AGB) star lost its outer hydrogen-rich envelope, leaving behind a hot core (young white dwarf)—the central star of the nebula. The star in the center of Fleming 1 has a temperature of 80,000 ± 15,000 K and mass of 0.56^{+0.3}_{−0.04}M_{☉}.

Observations performed by European Southern Observatory showed that the central star is in fact a double degenerate (made of two white dwarfs) binary with a period of 1.1953 ± 0.0002 days. The companion is probably an older white dwarf of a higher mass—0.64 to 0.7 M_{☉}. Its temperature is about 120,000 K providing the bulk of high energy photons needed to ionize the nebula. The jets likely formed as a result of accretion of the material from the AGB star onto this white dwarf. The accretion led to the formation of a precessing accretion disk, which was expelling material along its rotational axis leading to the formation of jets and knots. The past accretion events also explain the high temperature of the second white dwarf.
