= Chelmos Observatory =

Astronomical observatory in Greece

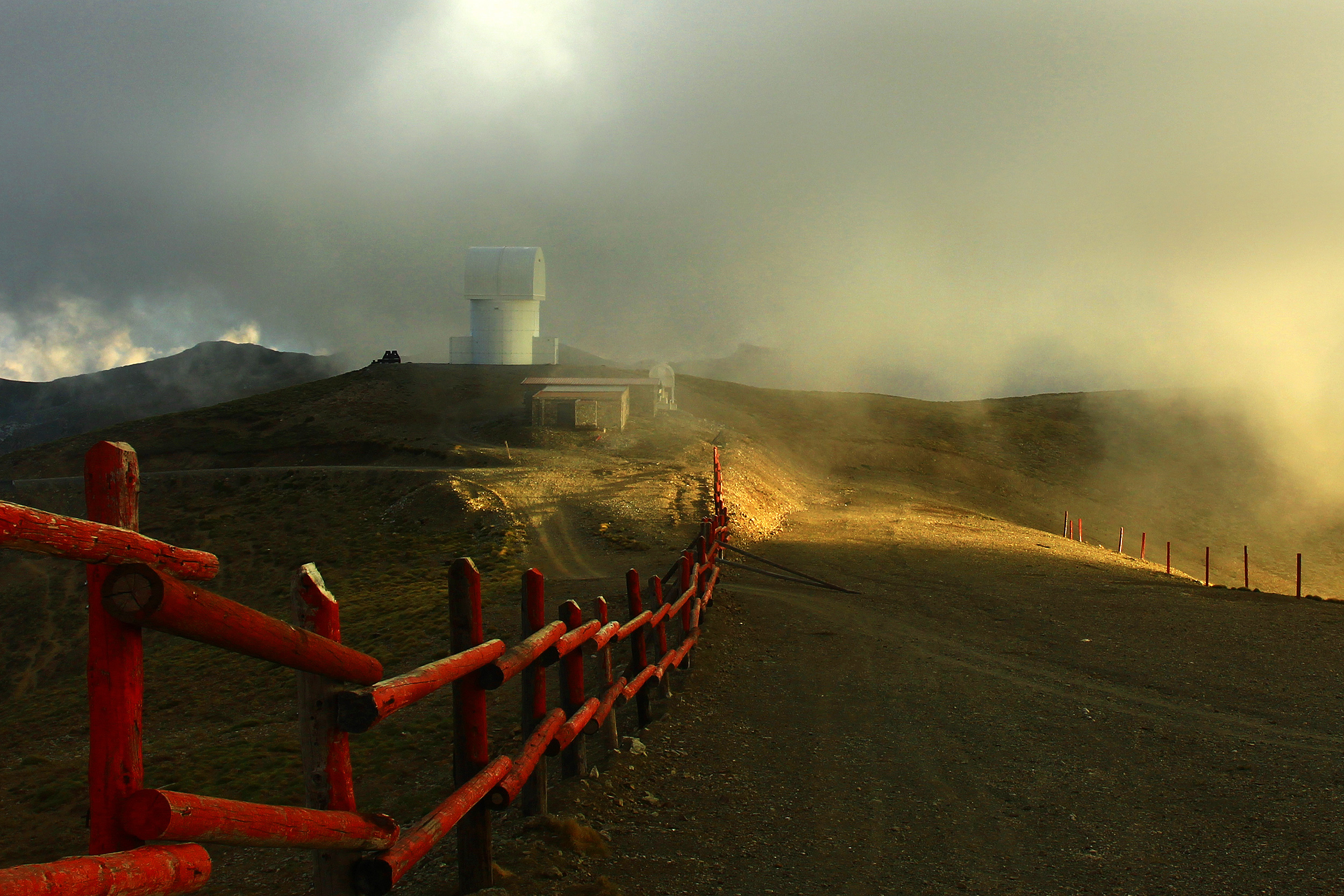
- Chelmos Observatory "Aimilios Charlaftis"
- Organization: National Observatory of Athens
- Location: Kalavryta Municipality, Achaea, Western Greece, Decentralized Administration of Peloponnese, Greece
- Coordinates: 37°59′09″N 22°11′54″E
- Website: helmos.astro.noa.gr
- Telescopes: Aristarchos 2.3 m Telescope

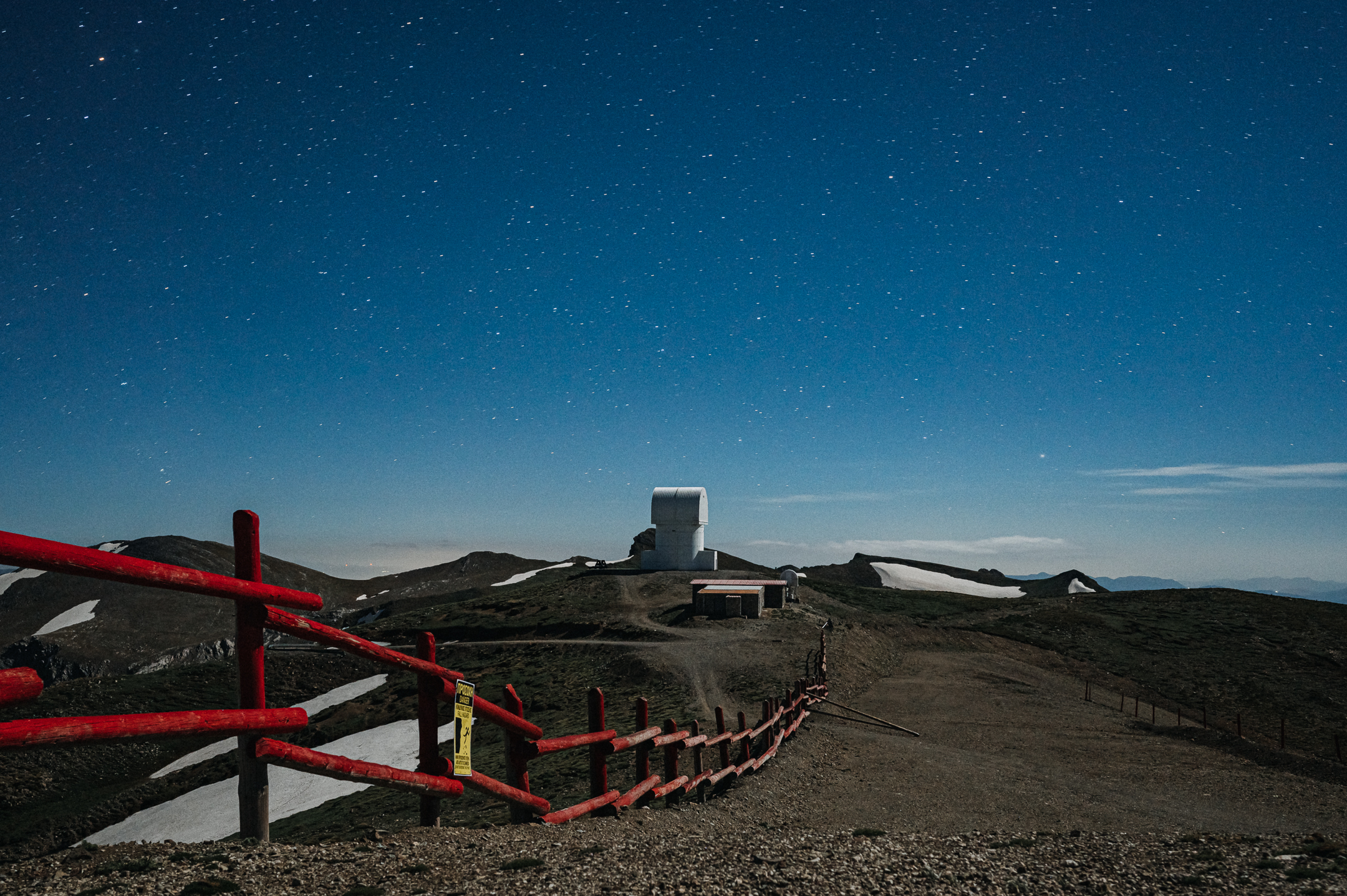

The Helmos or Chelmos Observatory (Greek: Αστεροσκοπείο Χελμού) is an observatory located at the top of mount Chelmos, near Kalavryta, Southern Greece. It is the largest research infrastructure of the National Observatory of Athens and IAASARS. Its main equipment is the Aristarchos 2.3 m Telescope, manufactured by German company Carl Zeiss AG,

Construction of the observatory and its telescope was funded through the European Commission EPET II programme, administered by Greece's General Secretariat for Research and Technology.

== See also ==
- List of astronomical observatories
