= PCO Imaging =

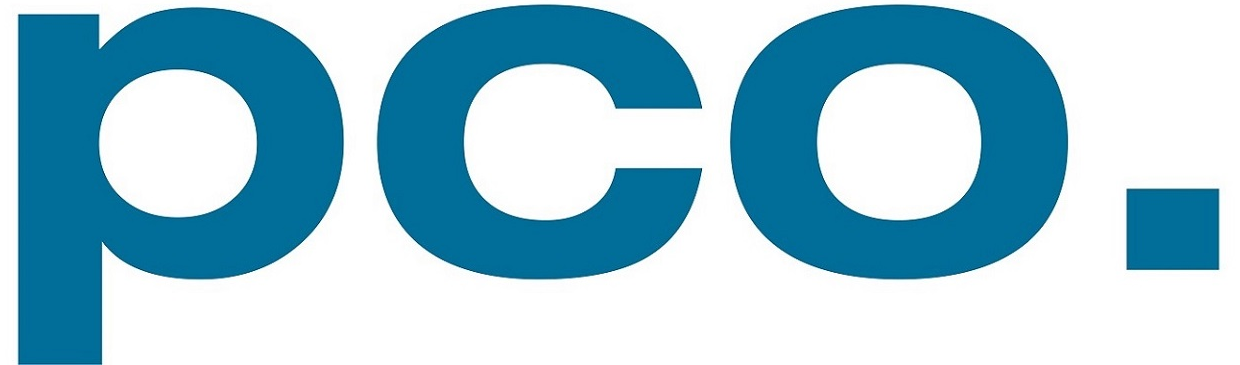
- Company type: Aktiengesellschaft
- Founded: 1987
- Founder: Emil Ott
- Headquarters: Kelheim, Germany, subsidiaries in the United States, Canada, Singapore, China
- Area served: worldwide
- Products: scientific camera systems
- Website: www.pco.de

PCO Imaging (PCO AG) is a developer and manufacturer of camera systems for scientific and industrial applications.

== History ==
The company was founded in 1987 by Emil Ott, who worked as a researcher at the Technical University of Munich. During the conducting of scientific measurements with intensified slow scan cameras, he was convinced of the fact that the existing camera standard did not meet the requirements of scientific applications. Therefore, he founded PCO (Pioneers in Cameras and Optoelectronics) to improve the technology of the existing camera systems. The developed technologies of PCO are since then used for DNA sequencing, machine vision, solar cell quality control, measuring velocity and surveillance alongside to microscopy and further applications.

== Products ==
STS-135 last Space Shuttle liftoff in slow motion

The company designs, manufactures and distributes scientific imaging devices equipped with scientific complementary metal–oxide–semiconductor (sCMOS), complementary metal–oxide–semiconductor (CMOS) and charge-coupled device (CCD) sensor technology. In 2016, the company introduced the first luminescence lifetime imaging camera based on a high frequency modulated CMOS image sensor which is called pco.flim. The pco.flim CMOS camera can be used for a vast variety of biomedical applications that require a large frame and high-speed acquisition.

The new technology for sCMOS (scientific CMOS) image sensors was launched in 2009 during the Laser World of Photonics fair in Munich as Joint Venture from PCO with the companies Andor Technology and Fairchild Camera and Instrument. In general, CCD-based cameras offer high sensitivity but slow sampling speeds. Conventional CMOS cameras offer very fast frame rates, but compromise dynamic range. sCMOS image sensors, on the other hand, offer extremely low noise, rapid frame rates, wide dynamic range, high quantum efficiency, high resolution, and a large field of view simultaneously in one image. This makes them particularly suitable for high fidelity, quantitative scientific measurement and low-light-level conditions.

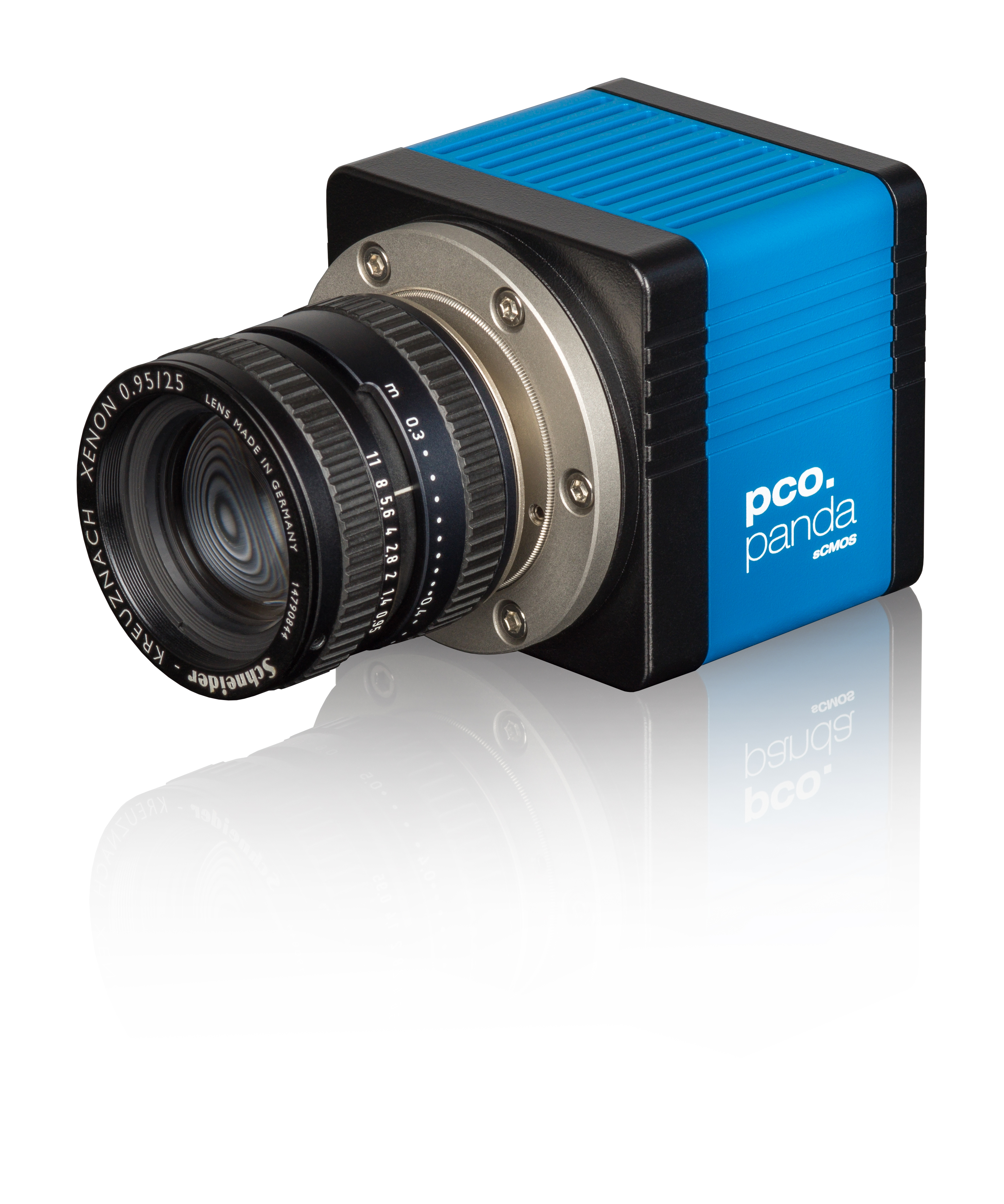
pco.panda 4.2 - 16 bit sCMOS compact camera
