= Europlanet =

Network of planetary scientists

Europlanet is a network linking planetary scientists from across Europe. The aim of Europlanet is to promote collaboration and communication between partner institutions and to support missions to explore the Solar System.

EuroPlaNet co-ordinates activities in Planetary Sciences in order to achieve a long-term integration of this discipline in Europe.

In 2021, they produced a pocket atlas to Mars.

== Objectives ==
The objectives are to:

1. increase the productivity of planetary projects with European investment, with emphasis on major planetary exploration missions;
2. initiate a long-term integration of the European planetary science community;
3. improve European scientific competitiveness, develop and spread expertise in this research area,
4. improve public understanding of planetary environments.

These objectives will be achieved by:

1. maximizing synergies between different fields contributing to planetary sciences: space observations, earth-based observations, laboratory studies, numerical simulations, data base development;
2. co-ordinating the design and development of an Integrated and Distributed Information Service (IDIS) providing access to the full set of data sources produced by these complementary fields. EuroPlaNet integrates most of the European planetary exploration work, with initial focus on the Cassini–Huygens mission to Saturn and Titan, operative between 2004 and 2008. The considerable involvement of the European science community in this mission, the broad diversity of its research objectives and the urgent need to achieve a balanced share of data analysis and its results with American colleagues make Cassini–Huygens an ideal test-bed for the development of activities and tools which will contribute to the optimal exploitation of subsequent planetary missions.

In addition to overall co-ordination, 6 further activities will be carried out over a 4-year period:

1. discipline working groups;
2. co-ordinate earth-based observations to support and complement space missions;
3. develop an outreach strategy;
4. exchange of personnel;
5. EuroPlaNet-specific meetings and conferences;
6. definition of the basic requirements for future implementation of IDIS for planetary sciences.

== See also ==
- List of astronomical societies
