= Illustrators of Alice's Adventures in Wonderland =

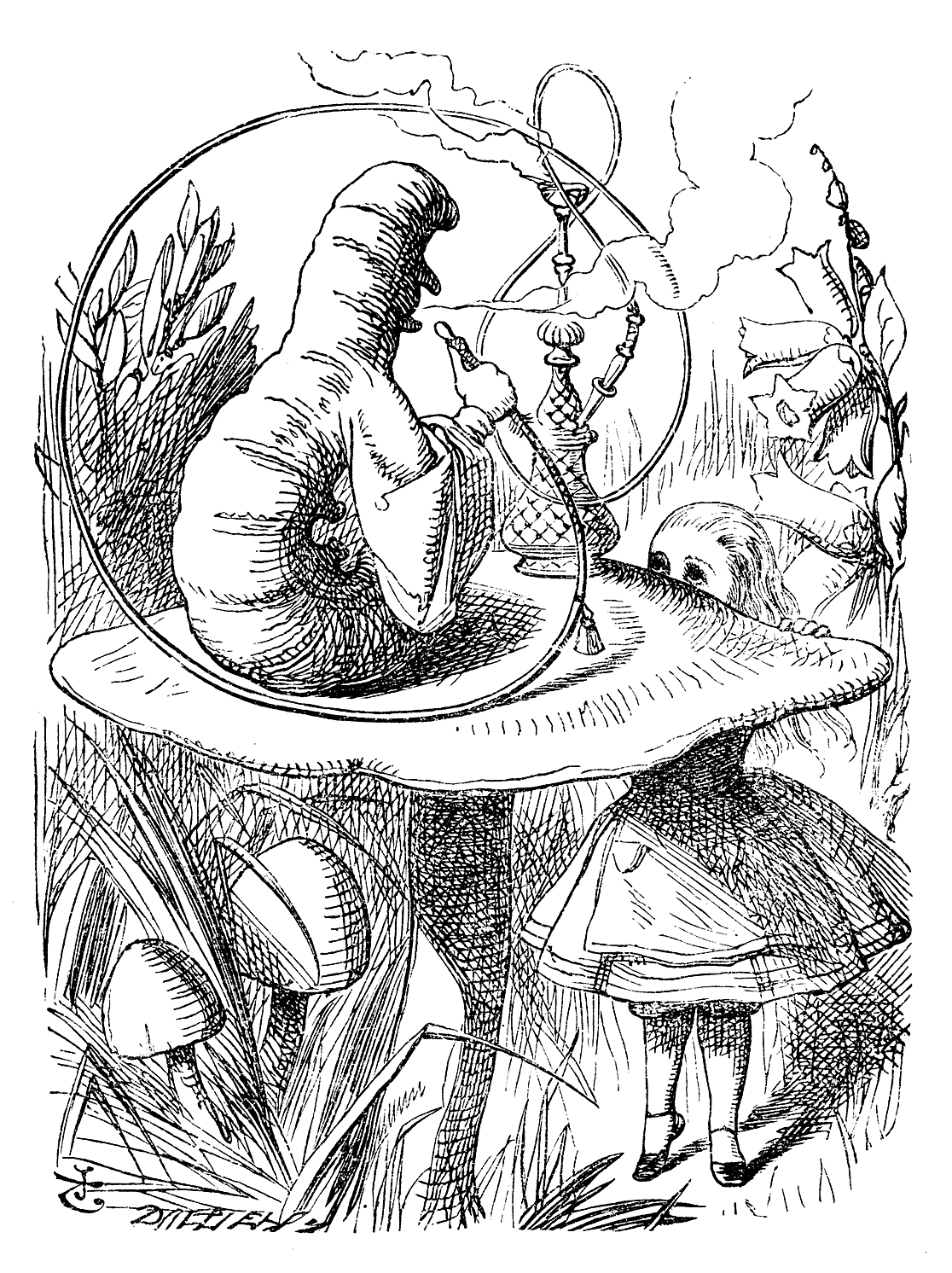
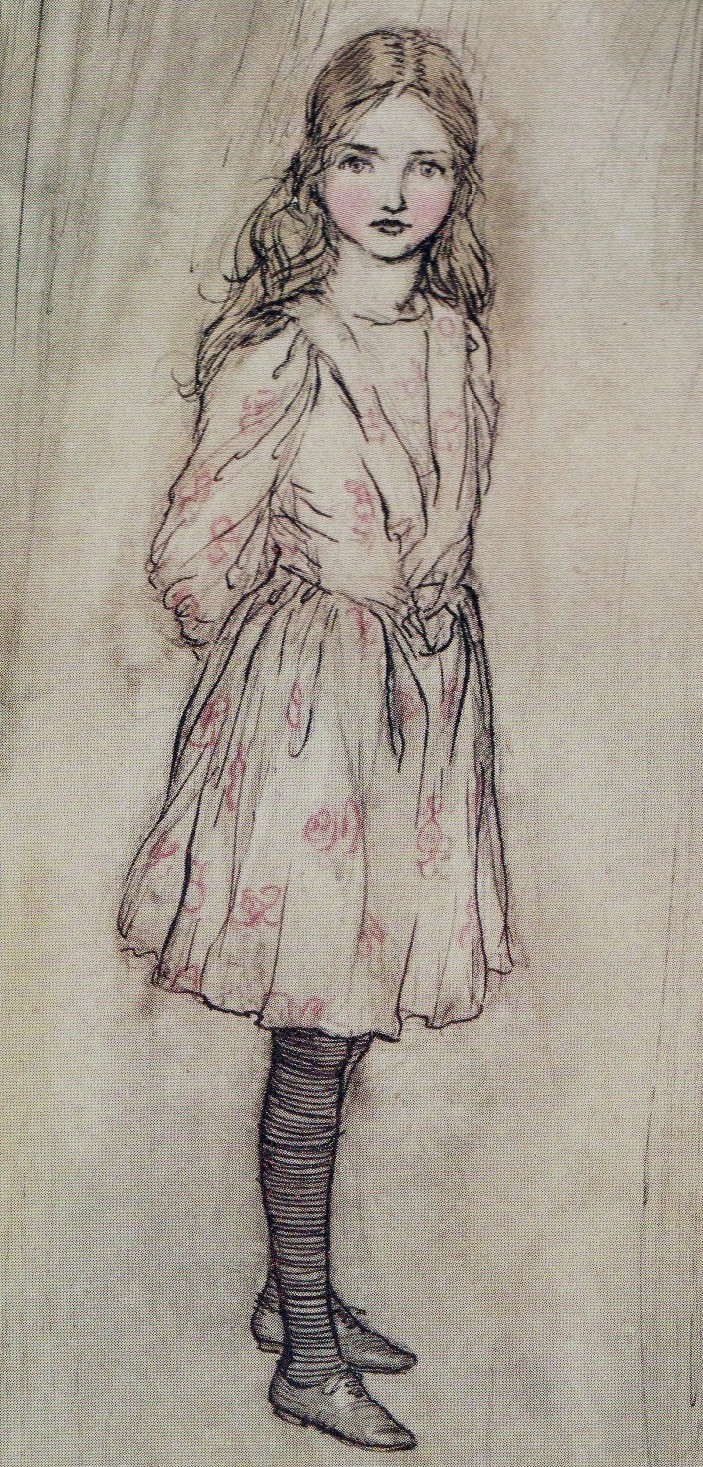
The illustrator for the original editions in 1865 (left) was John Tenniel. Alice illustrated in 1907 (right) by Arthur Rackham.

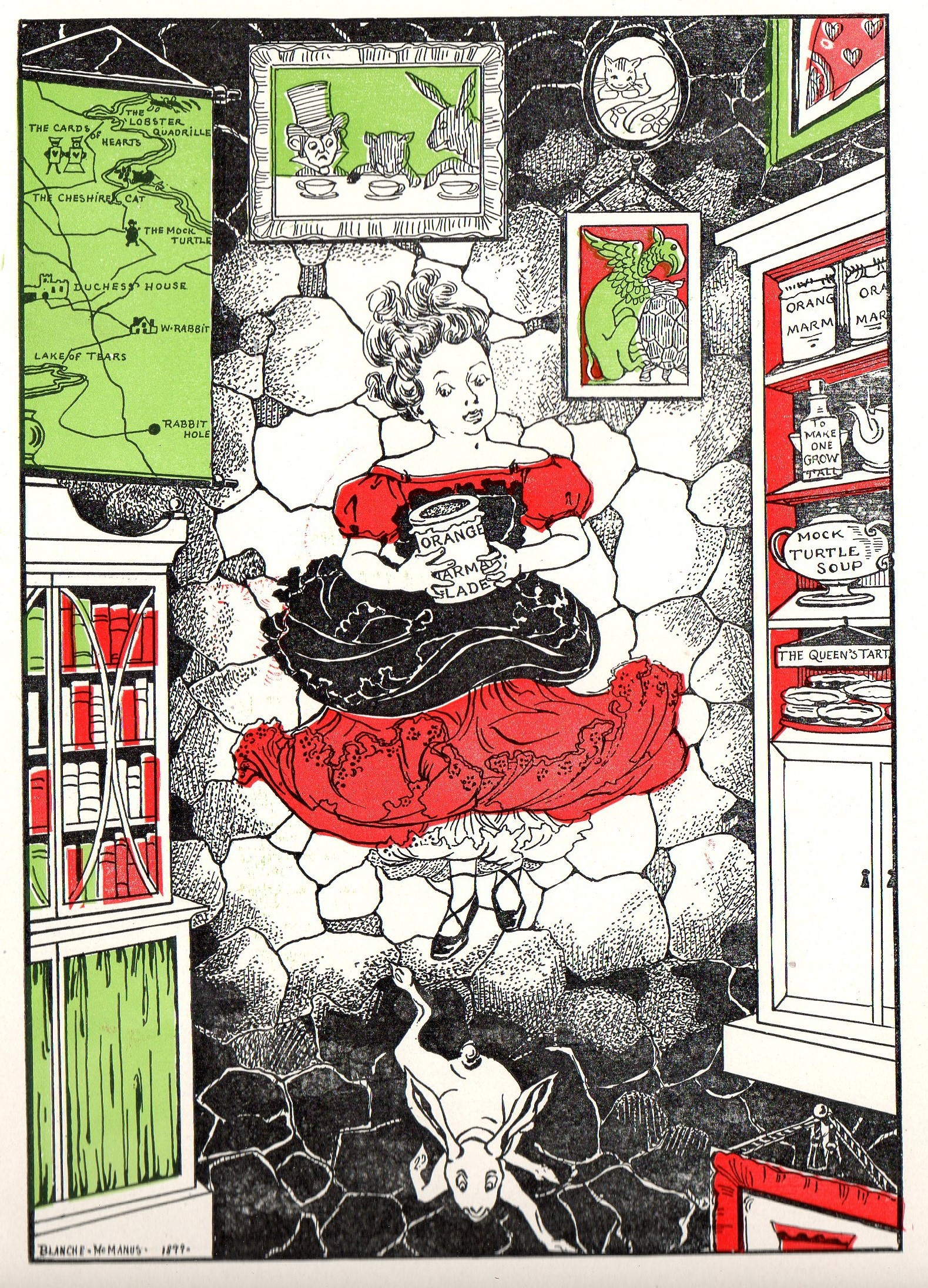
Alice by Blanche McManus in 1899

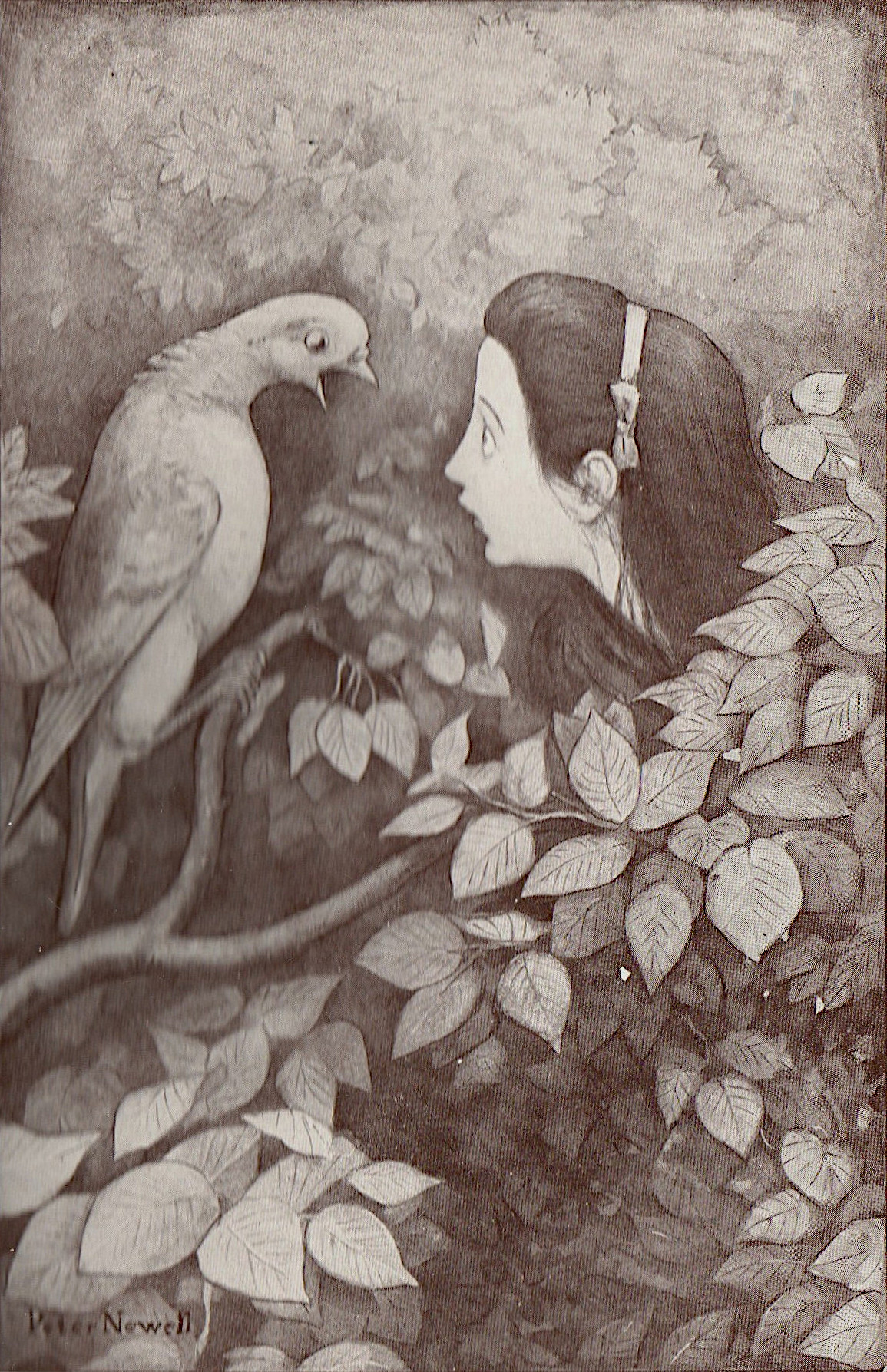
Alice by Peter Newell in 1901

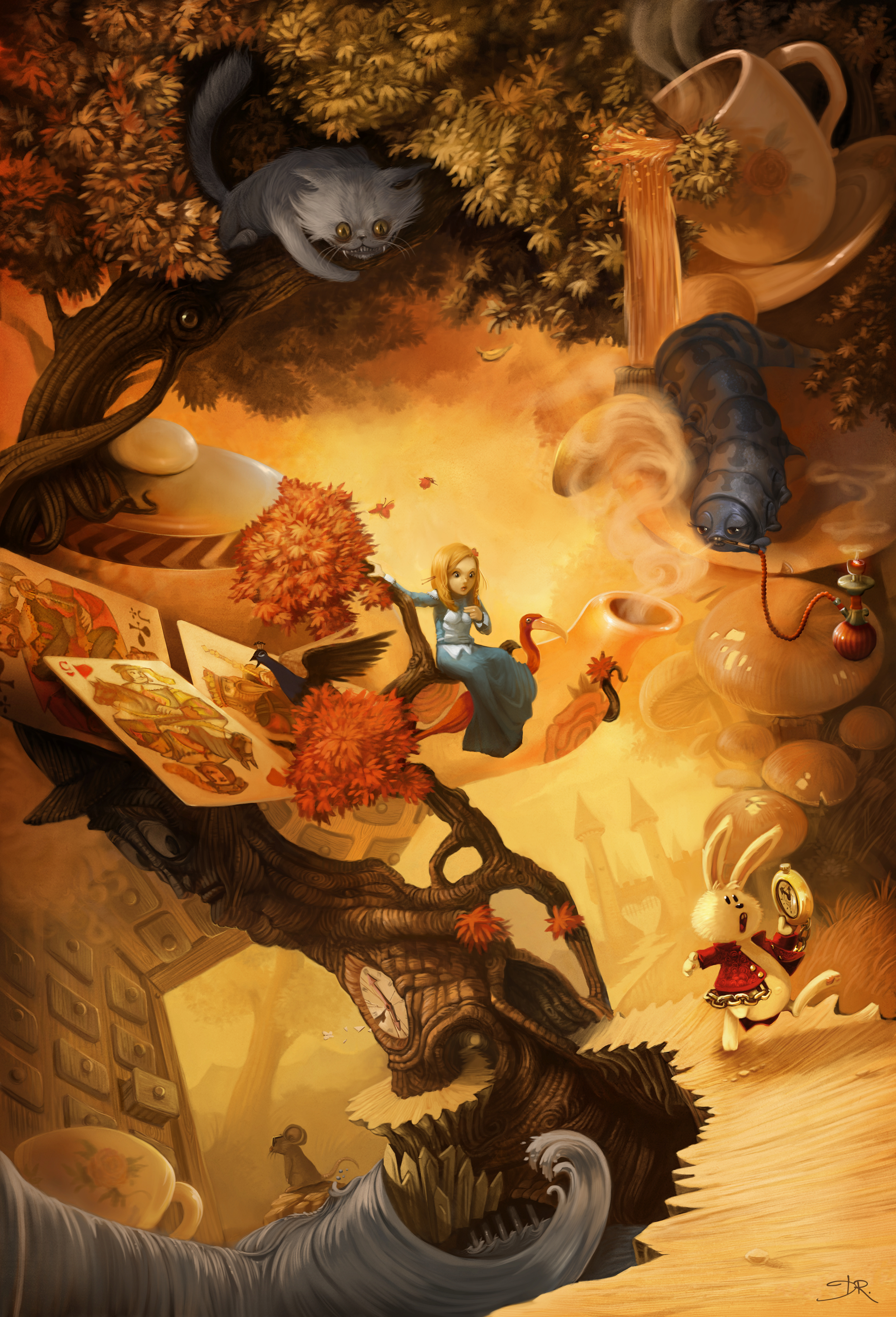
In 2010, artist David Revoy received the CG Choice Award for his digital painting "Alice in Wonderland".

There are more than 100 illustrators of English-language editions of Alice's Adventures in Wonderland (1865) and Through the Looking-Glass (1871), with many other artists for non-English language editions. The illustrator for the original editions was John Tenniel, whose illustrations for Alice and Looking Glass are among the best known illustrations ever published.

Alice's Adventures in Wonderland was first published in 1865, but it was withdrawn as the illustrator, Tenniel, was unhappy with the quality of the printing. The text blocks were sent to America where they were bound with a new title page and sold there.

Apart from E. Gertrude Thomson, who illustrated the cover of The Nursery "Alice" (1890), the first artist other than Tenniel to produce illustrations for Alice was Beatrix Potter, who created six illustrations in the 1890s although none appeared in book form.

== Copyright ==
In America, until 1891, publishers could reprint British books without the copyright restraint, but from that date on they had to get the agreement of the UK publishers and authors. As a result, several US publishing houses issued copies of the Alice books with Tenniel illustrations. McManus was the first to attempt the task of providing new illustrations for the books in 1899. Up to 1907, Macmillan held the exclusive copyright of Alice's Adventures in Britain and the Colonies. When the copyright ran out many publishers took the opportunity to issue the Alice book with new illustrations, and around 20 editions appeared in the following two years alone. (The Through the Looking-Glass copyright did not run out until 1948).

== List of illustrators ==
- John Tenniel, first editions published by Macmillan, London: Alice's Adventures in Wonderland in 1865, Through the Looking Glass in 1871, and illustrated Carroll's children's book The Nursery "Alice" in 1890.
- Blanche McManus, the first American editions of the Alice books with new illustrations, published by Mansfield & Wessels in 1899. The books were published in a combined edition in 1900 by Wessels, after the publishing partnership dissolved.
- J. R. Sinclair, an illustrated Alice published by The National Sunday School Union (London) in the Red Nursery Series (bright, pictorial paper-covered boards), no date (c. 1900–1910). Also in plain gray cloth boards.
- Peter Newell, Alice published by Harper USA in 1901 & Looking-Glass in 1902
- Fanny Y. Cory, first Alice in 1902, then a combined Alice and Looking Glass in 1905. Both by Rand McNally.
- Maria L. Kirk (& John Tenniel) Alice published by Frederick Stokes NY USA in 1904 and Looking-Glass in 1905
- J. Watson Davis, joint edition of Alice and Looking Glass published by A. L. Burt, New York, in 1905 with color plates by Davis in addition to the Tenniel illustrations. Davis also provided the frontispiece for Alice's Adventures in Wonderland Retold in Words of One Syllable, Burt, 1905.
- Bessie Pease Gutmann, Alice first published by Dodge USA in 1907 & Looking-Glass in 1909; first UK edition by Milne in 1908
- Thomas Maybank, published by Routledge (c. 1907–1908)
- Millicent Sowerby, published by Chatto & Windus in 1907, then an American edition by Duffield/Chatto & Windus in 1908. These editions each contain 12 illustrations. A second set of eight, different illustrations appears in a completely separate edition published by Henry Frowde/Hodder and Stoughton (London) in 1908.
- Arthur Rackham, published by Heinemann in 1907 in a limited edition of 1,130 copies; also a trade edition in a smaller format
- Charles Robinson, published by Cassell in 1907
- W. H. Walker, published by John Lane in 1907. There are around five different binding variants of the first edition including; leather, suede, blue cloth and paper-covered boards.
- Brinsley Le Fanu, published by Benn in one volume (c. 1907)
- R. E. McEune, color frontispiece & 21 b&w's, published by Milner & Co. (c. 1907)
- Alice Ross, published by Nimmo, Hay & Mitchell, no date (c. 1907)
- T. H. Robinson & Charles Pears, published by Collins in 1908
- Harry Rountree, published by Nelson in 1908. There was also a new edition published by Collins in 1928 with new illustrations by Rountree.
- Walter Hawes, published by Scott in 1908
- John R. Neill (illustrator of Baum's Oz books), Alice, Reilly and Lee (The Children's Red Books), 1908
- (Evelyn) Stuart Hardy, published by John F. Shaw (c. 1908). There are 8 illustrations but within 2 issues of the book (4 in one and a different 4 in another). There is also an undated edition from the same publisher with all eight illustrations.
- K. M. Roberts, also known as K.M.R., an edition of Alice published by Partridge in 1908
- Harry Furniss, published in Arthur Mee's The Children's Encyclopædia during 1908–1909.
- N. Buchanan, Alice only, b&w, published by Chambers 1909, reprint 1930.
- Mabel Lucie Attwell, published by Raphael Tuck in 1910
- George Soper, published by Headley 1911
- Gordon Robinson, (apparently) first published by Samuel Gabriel and Sons (1911), in softcover (linen) 4to, with four color plates plus a separate full-page color cover illustration, plus other text illustrations (not to be confused by a later, smaller-8vo-softcover publication by the same publisher with a cover by Burley and four plates by Robinson). A second, different suite of six illustrations (for Alice only again) was published by Charles H. Kelly in 1916, and then by Epworth (undated), who also published later editions with fewer plates. The Gabriel illustrations were also published in hardcover by Samuel Gabriel and Sons (1916) with five color plates
- Hugo von Hofsten, Alice, published by Barse & Hopkins, no date (dated by inscription, 1915). 6 color plates after Tenniel. Several later editions have fewer plates. There is an edition, smaller format with different boards, by Brewer, Barse (Chicago), which is dated by inscription, in one copy, as 1910, so Brewer, Barse may be the first published edition.
- Frank Adams, published by Blackie in 1912
- Emily Overnell, Alice only, published by Everett and Company. Illustration limited to frontispiece, which incorporates the title page (2-page illustration). This is color in one copy I own, b&w in the other. The illustrator's name appears only as a signature on the frontispiece, followed by "'12," which thus suggests a publication date of about 1912.
- Alice B. Woodward, published by Bell in 1913
- Millicent Sowerby, published by Hodder & Stoughton in 1913 – a new set of illustrations, not a reprint of her 1907 work
- A. E. Jackson, published by Humphrey Milford in 1915
- Margaret W. Tarrant, published by Ward Lock in 1916 with 48 illustrations
- Milo Winter, published by Rand McNally & Company in 1916
- Agnes Richardson, published by Geographia Ltd., no date (c. 1920)
- Elenore Abbott Alice and Looking-Glass (with the Tenniel illustrations), George W. Jacobs & Co., no date (c. 1920, the date of a personal inscription in this copy), The Washington Square Classics
- Charles Folkard, published by Black in 1921 – the poems from the Alice books set to music by Lucy E. Broadwood
- A. L. Bowley, published by Tuck in 1921
- Edgar B. Thurstan, Alice and Looking Glass, Odhams Press Ltd (London), no date (c. 1921)
- Gwynedd M. Hudson, published by Hodder & Stoughton in 1922 in a limited edition
- Dudley Jarrett, published by Readers Library, undated (c. 1924)
- Gertrude Welling (cover, copyright page and purple border illustrations on every page) and Christopher Rule (brown end pages), Alice in Wonderland and Through the Looking Glass, printed on large paper, published by J. H. Sears & Co., Inc, New York (c 1926)
- Hume Henderson, published by Readers Library, undated (c. 1928)
- Winifred M. (Mary) Ackroyd (black and white illustrations), Joyce Mercer (color illustrated covers all around, including spine). Collins (Collins Bumper Reward Books, early 1920s (undated, but 1924 inscription).
- Winifred M. (Mary) Ackroyd (black & white illustrations), Jessie M. King (color illustrated covers all around, including spine), Charles Pears (colour frontis & title page), published by Collins (Collins Bumper Reward Books, c. 1928).
- Willy Pogany, published by E.P. Dutton and Company, 1929
- Emma E. Clark, color frontispiece and three other color plates (signed E. Clark) alongside Tenniel illustrations in 1930 edition of Alice's Adventures in Wonderland Retold in Words of One Syllable by J. C. Gorham (This text was first published in 1905 with illustrations by J. Watson Davis – see above). Publisher: A.L. Burt.
- Mary Smith, Alice's Adventures in Wonderland. London: Coker, no date (1930s). 4 color plates and b&w illustrations and vignettes. There is a taped label on title page that gives illustrator's name. Original name (under the tape) was Bessie Pease. But these are definitely not illustrations by Pease. Strange copy.
- KMR (K.M.Roberts) drawings, frontispiece by Newsome, dust jacket illustration by Clossop (spelling?). Alice, Frederick Warne & Co., Ltd., c. 1930s.
- Beth Goe Willis, blue & black line drawings in text. Alice in Wonderland (abridged by Dorothy Fleming), Tower Books, 1930. 4to, softcover. Busy, full color wraparound covers depicting a raft of characters.
- Helen Munro, published by Nelson in 1932
- Dorothy Newsome, Alice in Wonderland, small (12mo) softcover published by McDougall's Educational Co., Ltd., London & Edinburgh, no date, but contemporary ownership inscription dated 1933
- J. Morton Sale, published by Wm Clowes (c. 1933)
- D. R. Sexton, published by Shaw in 1933
- Helen Jacobs, published by Philip & Tacey in 1935, Alice retold by Constance M. Martin
- M. L. Clements, published by Hutchinson (c. 1936)
- Honor C. Appleton, published by Harrap in 1936
- A. H. Watson, published by Collins in 1939
- Irene Mountford, published by Collins in 1939 with stills from the Paramount film
- Gil Dyer, published by Foulsham (c. 1939)
- Rene Cloke, Alice published by Gawthorn in 1943 and Looking-Glass in 1950. These illustrations were also published by the Waverly Book Co. and the Educational Book Co. Besides the Gawthorn, which is best known, she published another, different set of illustrations with Dean and Son in 1969, and a third different set in The Radiant Way: Fourth Step, in 1934.
- Anthony Rado, published by Cornelius (c. 1944)
- Robert Högfeldt, published (in a Swedish combined edition) by Jan Förlag, Sweden, in 1945. English edition, same publisher, also 1945.
- Harry Riley, published by Arthur Barron in 1945
- Linda Card, Alice published by Whitman in 1945
- Mervyn Peake, first published by Zephyr, Sweden in 1946 and then by Wingate, London in 1954
- Richard Ogle, Alice, Arandar Books, 1946. Green, orange and white illustrations, same palette as McManus.
- Eileen Soper, published by Harrap in 1947.
- Hugh Gee (& John Tenniel), published by Max Parrish in 1948 with 16 innovative photographs of scenes composed and shot by Gee.
- Philip Gough, published by Heirloom in 1949
- Leonard Weisgard, Alice and Looking-Glass in one volume, published by Harper and Brothers in 1949.
- Donald Glue, Alice and Looking Glass, Colorgravure Publications, Melbourne, Australia, no date (1949?).
- Alice in Wonderland Press Out Toy Theatre, with colored figures [based on Tenniel illustrations] and stage to be constructed. Tower Press, "No. 446, British made", 1950
- A. A. Nash, Alice in Wonderland published by Juvenile Productions, no date (c. 1950s)
- G. W. Backhouse, published by Collins in 1951
- John Huehnergarth, Winston, 1952
- David Walsh, Alice, Blackie and Son, 1954. Four full-page plates. (Walsh apparently did a second suite of 16 color plates. See Walsh and Cooper, 1962)
- Marjorie Torrey, abridged Alice published by Random House in 1955.
- Libico Maraja, Alice published by W. H. Allen in 1957 & Looking-Glass in 1959
- Patricia Morris, published by Beaverbrook (c. 1960)
- Pauline Baynes, published by Blackie (c. 1960)
- David Walsh & John Cooper, combined Alice and Looking Glass, published by Ward Lock in 1962. According to the dust jacket, Walsh did the 16 color plates and the black-and-white vignettes. What Cooper contributed is unclear. (See also Walsh's Alice, 1954)
- Tove Jansson, Swedish edition, 1966; first English-language edition published in 1977 by Delacorte Press, New York; first UK edition by Tate Publishing in 2011
- Ralph Steadman, Alice published by Dobson in 1967 & Looking-Glass published by MacGibbon & Kee in 1972
- Janet and Anne Grahame Johnstone, published by World Distribution in 1968
- Salvador Dalí, published by Maecenas Press, New York in 1969
- Kuniyoshi Kaneko, published by Olivette in 1974
- Moritz Kennel, published by Phaidon in 1975
- Charles Blackman, ISBN 058950388X, published by Reed in 1982, ed. Nadine Amadio
- Barry Moser, Alice published in a limited edition by Pennyroyal in 1982 & Looking-Glass the same year.
- John Speirs, Alice in Wonderland and Through the Looking-Glass in one volume, published by Julian Messner in 1982
- S. Michelle Wiggins, Alice published by Ariel Books, Alfred A. Knopf, 1983, and Looking-Glass published by Ariel Books, Alfred A. Knopf, 1986
- Walter Anderson, Anderson's Alice, linoleum cuts, 1983, University of Mississippi Press.
- Justin Todd, Alice published by Gollancz in 1984 & Looking-Glass in 1986
- Anthony Browne, published by MacRae in 1985. Winner of the Kurt Maschler Award.
- Michael Hague, published by Holt, Rinehart & Winston, NY in 1985
- Julia Christie, both Alice in Wonderland and Through the Looking Glass, in one volume, published by Cathay Books Ltd, 1986 (Illustrations Copyright Octopus Books 1985)
- Eric Kincaid, published by Brimax in 1988
- George A. Walker, first Canadian artist to illustrate both books, Alice in 1988, Looking-Glass in 1998, published by Cheshire Cat Press
- Markéta Prachatická, folio, black and white, Alice and Looking Glass, Wellington Publishing, Inc., Chicago, 1989
- Peter Weevers, published by Hutchinson in 1989.
- Gavin O'Keefe, Alice, Carroll Foundation, Melbourne, Australia, 1990.
- Malcolm Ashman, Looking-Glass published by Dragon's World in 1989 and Alice in 1990.
- John Bradley, folio size illustrations of Alice as re-told by David Blair in "a young reader's edition", Courage Books imprint of Running Press, 1992
- Angel Dominguez, Alice, published by Workman Publishing, New York, 1996; Looking-Glass, published by Inky Parrott Press, Oxford, 2015 – limited edition signed by the artist
- Helen Oxenbury, Alice published by Walker in a signed limited edition in 1999 & Looking-Glass in 2005 Oxenbury won the Kate Greenaway Medal and the Kurt Maschler Award for Alice
- Lisbeth Zwerger, published by North-South Books in 1999
- Iassen Ghiuselev, abridged edition by Aufbau-Verlag in 2000, English edition by Simply Read Books, Vancouver in 2003
- Robert Sabuda, pop-up book published by Simon & Schuster in 2003
- Peter Blake, Looking-Glass only; published in a signed limited edition by D3 Editions in 2004.
- Michael Foreman, published by Sterling in 2004
- Greg Hildebrandt, published by Courage Books in 2004
- Anne Bachelier, published 2005 by Jerry N. Uelsmann Inc. in several different editions, both commercial and limited.
- Pat Andrea, published by Editions Diane de Selliers in 2006 (bilingual French and English edition of both Alice and Looking-Glass)
- Rodney Matthews, published by Templar 2008
- John Vernon Lord, Alice published in a limited edition by Artist's Choice in 2009 and Looking-Glass in 2011
- Robert Ingpen, Alice published by Walker Books 2009, Looking-Glass published by Templar 2015
- Emma Chichester Clark, Alice in Wonderland, Abridged text, HarperCollins, 2009
- Yayoi Kusama, published by Penguin in 2012
- Maggie Taylor, photographic illustrations of Alice, published by Jerry N. Uelsmann Inc., 2012
- Iassen Ghiuselev, Alice’s Adventures in Wonderland, Simply Read, 2012
- Emma Chichester Clark, Alice Through the Looking-Glass, HarperCollins, 2013
- Kriss Sison, omnibus edition with manga-influenced illustrations, published by Seven Seas in 2014
- Fran Parreno, Alice’s Adventures in Wonderland (Usborne Illustrated Originals), 2014
- In 2015, Inky Parrot Press published a limited edition of Alice with a different artist for each chapter.
- Angel Dominguez, Looking-Glass published by Inky Parrot Press, 2015, limited to 180 standard and 82 special copies
- Rébecca Dautremer, Alice in Wonderland, published by Hodder Children's Books, 2015. First published in Francein 2010 by Hachette Livre
- Benjamin Lacombe, Alice au pays des merveilles and Alice de L’Autre Cote Du Miroir [French], Cernunnos, 2015
- Anna Bond, Alice’s Adventures in Wonderland, Penguin, 2015
- Andrea d’Aquino, Alice in Wonderland: Classics Reimagined, Rockport, 015
- David Delamare, Alice with a colour illustration on every page, published by Wendy Ice, 2016
- Charles van Sandwyk, published by Folio Society, 2016, limited edition of 1,000 copies
- Various Russian Alice illustrators in Artist's Choice Editions, 2016, limited to 160 standard and 48 special copies
- Charles Santore, Alice’s Adventures in Wonderland, Sterling, 2017
- Gennady Kalinovsky, published by Inky Parrot Press, 2018, both books in limited editions of 140 & 120 copies respectively and available in a two-volume slip case
- Júlia Sardà, Alice’s Adventures in Wonderland, Pan Macmillan, 2019
- MinaLima (Miraphora Mina and Eduardo Lima), Alice’s Adventures in Wonderland & Through the Looking Glass, HarperDesign, 2019
- Chris Riddell, published by Macmillan, 2020
- Floor Rieder, published by Pushkin Press 2020 (Originally appeared in Amsterdam published by Haarlem in 2014)
- Riitta Oittinen, Alice's Adventures in Wonderland and Through the Looking-Glass and What Alice Found There. 2017-2021 Finland.
- Damir Mazinjanin, Alice in Wonderland and Through the Looking Glass Amaranthine Limited Edition, Amaranthine Press, 2021
- Grahame Baker-Smith, Alice’s Adventures in Wonderland, Templar Editions, 2021
- Paolo Barbieri, Alice in Wonderland, Llewellyn Publications, 2023
- Rosie Fowinkle, Alice’s Adventures in Wonderland – LitJoy Illustrated Classics, pop up, LitJoy Publishing, 2023
- Zansky, Alice’s Adventures In Wonderland & Underground, Jhambo Ink. July 2024.
