= Tyne and Wear Archives =

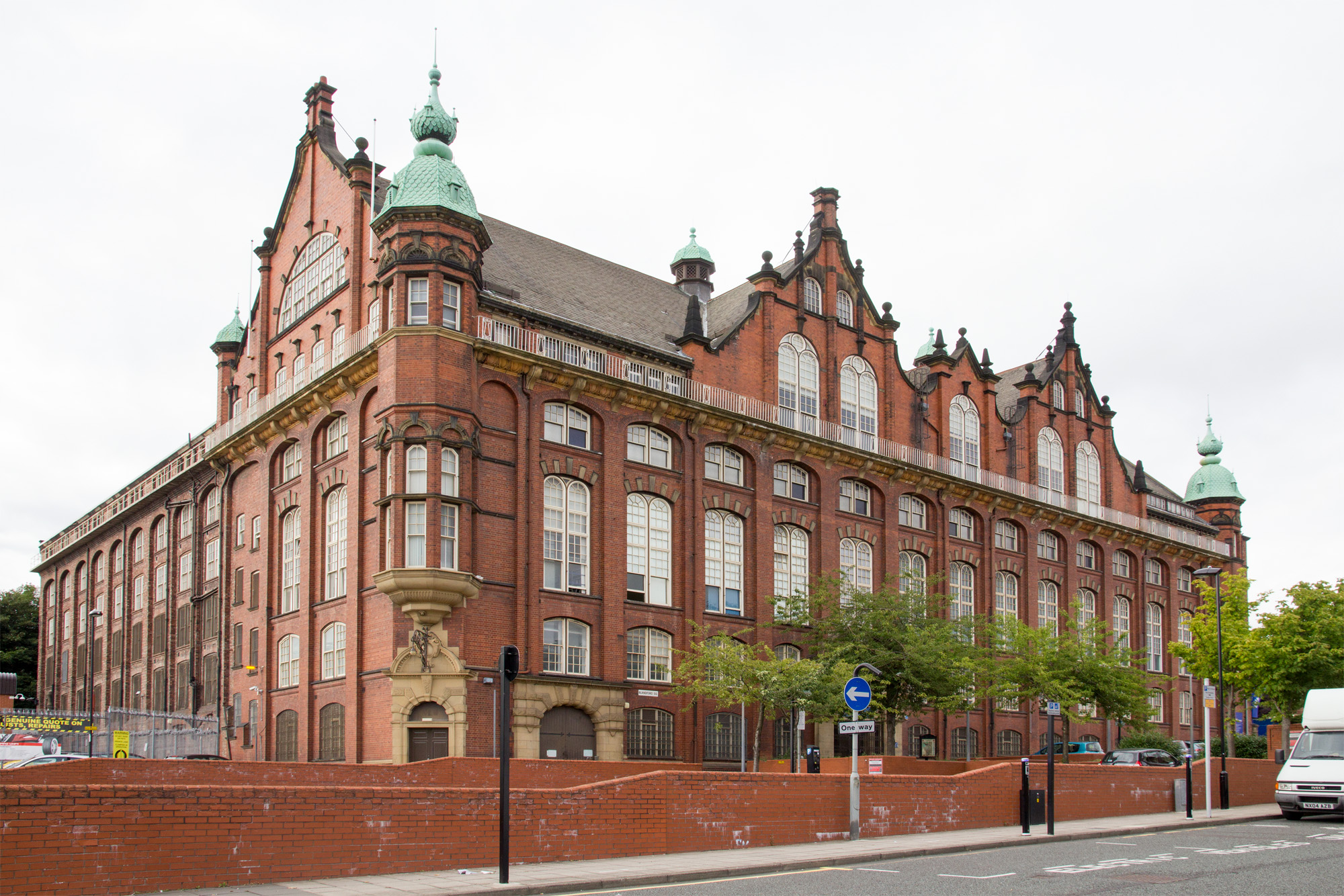
- The Tyne and Wear Archives Service is based in the former headquarters of the Co-operative Wholesale Society in the north east, which it shares with Discovery Museum

- Location in Tyne and Wear

General information
- Location: Tyne and Wear, England, UK
- Coordinates: 54.969°N 1.625°W
- OS grid: NZ240639

Tyne and Wear Archives (formerly known as Tyne and Wear Archives Service) is the record office for the metropolitan county of Tyne and Wear, in North East England. Tyne and Wear Archives preserve documents relating to the area from the 12th to the 21st century. It is based in the former headquarters of the Co-operative Wholesale Society, which it shares with Discovery Museum in Newcastle upon Tyne.

== History ==
The Archives Service was established in 1974 by Tyne and Wear County Council, drawing in the collections of the former Newcastle Archives Office, which closed. On the abolition of the county council in the local government reorganisation of 1986 Tyne and Wear Archives Service became a joint service of the five metropolitan districts, managed by Gateshead Council.

Since 1976 Tyne and Wear Archives Service has been located at Blandford House, Newcastle upon Tyne, the former headquarters of the Co-operative Wholesale Society, which it shares with Discovery Museum.

In April 2009 Tyne and Wear Archives Service merged with Tyne and Wear Museums to form Tyne & Wear Archives & Museums (TWAM).

In July 2013 it was announced that the Archives' Shipyards collections were included on the UNESCO Memory of the World Register. UNESCO stated: 'The shipbuilding collections deposited at Tyne & Wear Archives are the major source of information on the many shipyards in the North-East of England that helped to shape the unique identity of the region and made shipbuilding one of the key economic activities on Tyneside and Wearside.... The records are strong in both breadth and depth, and no other archive in England and Wales appears to hold such a wide and comprehensive range of material.'

In December 2013 The National Archives announced that Tyne and Wear Archives was amongst the first group of UK record offices to achieve Accredited Archive status.

== County / Chief Archivists ==
- Dr. W. A. L. (Allan) Seaman, County Archivist 1974–1986 [1930-2015]
- Bruce Jackson, Chief Archivist 1986–1993
- Liz Rees, Chief Archivist 1993–2016. [The title of Chief Archivist was abolished in 2012 and Liz Rees became 'Head of Archives and Collections', 2012–2016.]
- Lizzy Baker, Archives Lead 2018-

== Services ==
Tyne and Wear Archives have a public searchroom with space for visitors to consult original documents along with a microfilm area and PC cluster. A records management service for business and organisations has also been run by the Archives since the 1980s.

== Records (not an exhaustive list) ==
- William Armstrong, 1st Baron Armstrong (26 November 1810 – 27 December 1900) Tyneside industrialist who founded the Armstrong Whitworth manufacturing empire.
- SS Baikal, an ice-breaking train ferry that linked the eastern and western portions of the Trans-Siberian Railroad across Lake Baikal, constructed in Newcastle by Armstrong Whitworth.
- Thomas Bewick,(11 August 1753 – 8 November 1828) English engraver and natural history author.
- Clarke Chapman, a British engineering firm based in Gateshead.
- Ruth Dodds,(8 May 1890 - 1 April 1976) author, playwright, councillor and first woman Freeman of Gateshead.
- Jimmy Forsyth (photographer) (15 August 1913 – 11 July 2009) British amateur photographer, who in his later life became celebrated for his portrayal of the working class communities of Tyneside
- Sir Howard Grubb, Parsons and Co, telescope manufacturer, more commonly known as Grubb Parsons based in Newcastle upon Tyne.
- RMS Mauretania (1906), an ocean liner designed by Leonard Peskett and built by Swan, Hunter & Wigham Richardson at Wallsend, Tyne and Wear for the British Cunard Line, and launched on 20 September 1906.
- John Readhead & Sons, a shipyard on the River Tyne in South Shields, Tyne and Wear, England.
- Githa Sowerby (October 6, 1876 – June 30, 1970), English playwright and author of Rutherford & Son, children's writer, and member of the Fabian Society.
- Swan Hunter and Wigham Richardson Ltd, one of the best known shipbuilding companies in the world.
- Armstrong Whitworth, a major British manufacturing company of the early years of the 20th century.
