= Charles Rowley (socialist) =

British socialist and councillor

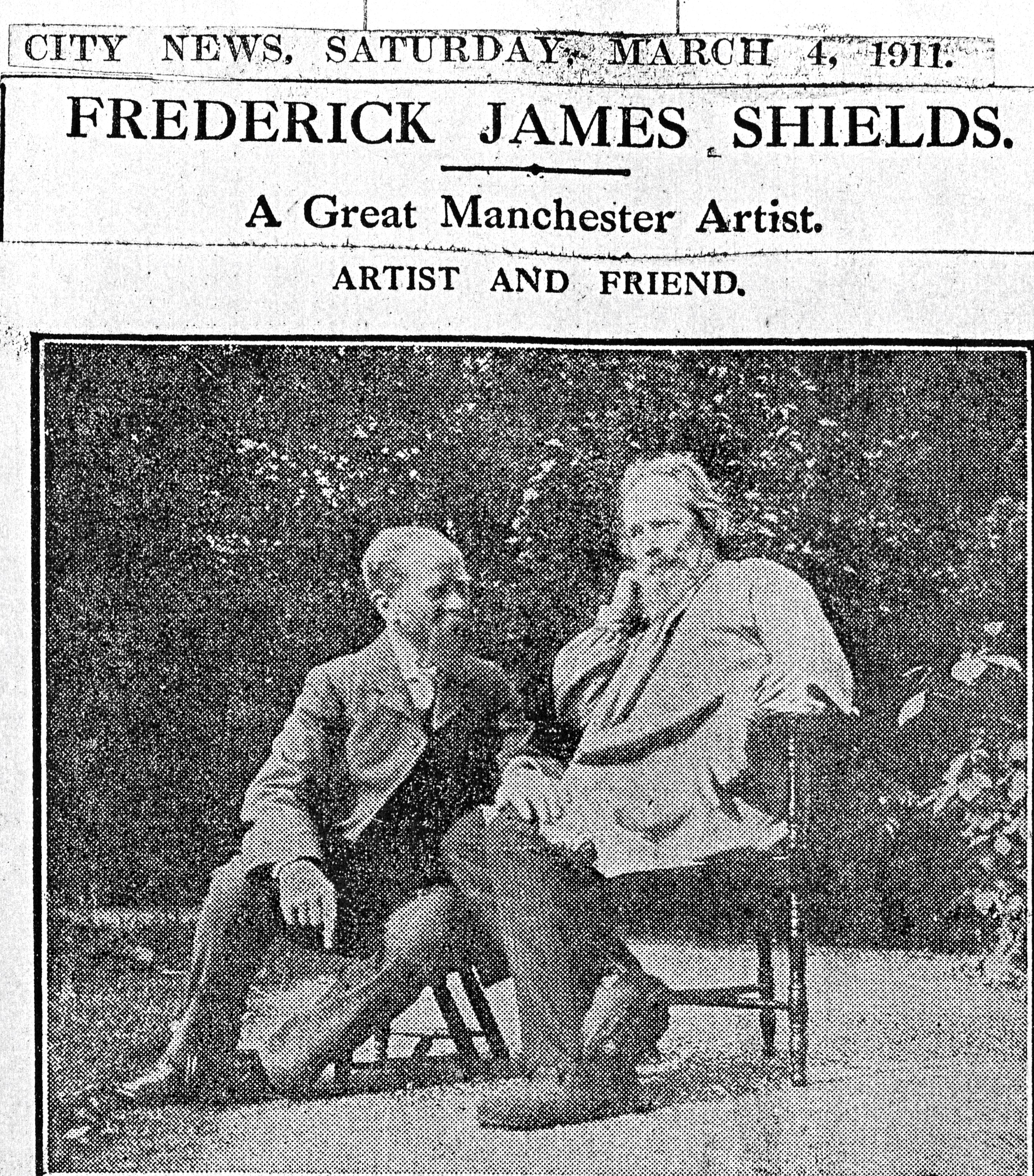
Charles Rowley and Frederic Shields in his garden, photographed by E. Gertrude Thomson (March 4, 1911)

Charles Rowley ("Rowley of Ancoats"; 1839 Ancoats – 1933 Handforth) was a British socialist and councillor of Ancoats, Manchester.

He was inspired by William Morris, and a leading member of the Ancoats Brotherhood. Amongst his other associates was the poet Mathilde Blind. In addition to founding public exhibitions and flower shows, he initiated concerts given at the city's parks; this work is amongst the earliest examples of orchestral concerts given for the public's benefit.

== Life ==
Rowley was the son of Charles Rowley ("a Radical of the old type and a Peterloo man"), born at Ancoats. He was in childhood rather delicate which restricted his education; later he learned well and also taught in the Bennett Street Schools, Oldham Road. In 1875 he was elected to the city council; in 1878 he gave up his Bennett Street work. He next began a movement called "Recreation in Ancoats" which was succeeded by the Ancoats Brotherhood. The movement encouraged cottage-window gardening and provided music in the local parks. From 1881 the Sunday afternoon lectures brought many notable speakers to Ancoats. Rowley became a magistrate in 1893. He was honoured with an honorary M.A. degree by the Victoria University in 1902. He was the author of Fifty Years of Work without Wages, 1912.
