= Emily Thomson =

Emily Thomson may refer to:

- Emily Thomson (footballer) (born 1993), Scottish footballer
- Emily Thomson (medical practitioner) (c. 1864–1955), co-founder of Dundee Women's Hospital
- E. Gertrude Thomson (1850–1929), British artist and illustrator

== See also ==
- Emily Thompson (born 1962), American historian
