= The Stepmother (1924 play) =

1924 play by Githa Sowerby

- Original language: English
- Written by: Githa Sowerby
- Characters: Charlotte Gaydon; Mary; Eustace Gaydon; Monica Gaydon; Betty Gaydon; Mr. Bennett; Lois Relph; Cyril Bennett; Peter Holland; Mrs. Geddes; Butler
- Subject: Marriage, Money
- Setting: indoors, Surrey, England, 1910s and 1920s

Premiere
- Date: January 13, 1924
- Place: New Theatre (London)

The Stepmother is a 1924 play by the British playwright Githa Sowerby. It tackles the tensions of female independence in a patriarchal society. The play was first staged for a single performance in January 1924 at the New Theatre in London's West End. It starred Campbell Gullen as Eustace Gaydon and Jean Cadell as Lois Relph.

Its first major revival was at the Shaw Festival, Canada in 2008 following the rediscovery of the manuscript. Its professional UK premiere at the Orange Tree Theatre, London, in February 2013. In March 2014 The Stepmother received its North of England premiere, being performed by York Settlement Community Players in the Studio at the York Theatre Royal. The play was produced at the Chichester Festival Theatre in 2017.

== Synopsis ==
The play begins as middle-aged widower Eustace Gaydon learns that his late sister Fanny has left £30,000 to her impoverished, young, orphaned companion Lois rather than to him. Eustace's financial troubles had left him hoping to inherit, so he woos Lois before she learns of her inheritance. The play continues a decade later. Lois has married Eustace to become the titular stepmother to his two daughters. She owns a successful dress-making business, but Eustace controls and mismanages the family's finances. It is an unhappy marriage, and Lois sought refuge from her misery in an affair with neighbor Peter Holland. When Lois seeks a dowry for her step-daughter's prospective marriage, the truth of Eustace's financial mismanagement emerges. Eustace confronts Peter and flees England with the remains of Lois's fortune.

== Initial production ==
The Stepmother was first performed on Sunday, January 13, 1924, in a performance by The Play Actors, and sponsored by Lady Wyndham, the former actress Mary Moore. The Play Actors was a private club that produced single-performance productions of both new and established plays; thus the one-time performance of The Stepmother was not the sign of a flop, but an effect of the production company. The magazine Illustrated Sporting and Dramatic News expressed surprise that "such a play should have to be presented by a play-producing society instead of by an ordinary management company whose fortune it might easily make." Despite this accolade, no subsequent production occurred. Sowerby biography Patricia Riley attributes this to a male-dominated British theatre scene that felt free to ignore plays by women.

== Critical reception ==
The Times review of the 1924 production focused almost exclusively on the role of Eustace. The review characterizes him as so "wicked" and "villainous" that the character "became incredible and ridiculous" and made a "sad mess of what was once an unusually promising play." The villainy was over-played, and the audience "was beyond caring for his crimes and was laughing at him as a farcical hypocrite." Reviewers of the more recent revival productions have likewise seen the overwhelming vile and venal character of Eustace as a structural weakness in the play. Writing for The Telegraph, Domenic Cavendish saw this weakness indicated by the audience's delivery of "the kind of boos usually reserved for Mr Punch" even as Cavendish also praised the actor's performance as "wonderfully reptilian account of masculinity". Reviewing the 2008 Shaw Festival revival, Christopher Hoile credits Eustace's character arc with a bit more nuance, writing, "If we do initially see him as a villain we end by viewing him as pitiful human being who has ruined his own life and knows he has done so without fully understanding why." And J. Ellen Gainor allows that the writing of Eustace's character may walk a fine line: "While Sowerby ensures that we quickly see through Eustace, she also deftly arranges her narrative so that the women in the play do not."

Where reviewers panned Eustace's one-dimensional role, they have been more receptive to the role of Lois. The 1924 Times reviewer called her "a woman of variety and truth;" Natasha Tripney called her "intriguingly shaded." J. Ellen Gainor wrote, "The role demands the convincing representation of Lois’s transformation from innocent adolescence to careworn maturity."

Several recent revivals after nearly a century of dormancy suggest that producers and audiences find relevance in the play despite its flaws. Gainor asserts that the success of the revivals at the Shaw Festival and the Orange Tree Theatre demonstrate "the continuing theatrical power and vitality" of the play. Laura Thompson writes that, despite the many advances in the status of women since 1924, the play "remains grimly pertinent." Charles Hutchison said the play "still has much to say to a modern audience."

== Biographical influence ==
Githa Sowerby grew up in a well-to-do family. Her father John George Sowerby was the director of the Ellison's Glass Works, and her mother had an annual income of £900. Under her father's leadership, the glass works undertook several new failed business ventures in the 1880s, and he eventually declared personal bankruptcy and sold the family home. When John George died, Githa's mother Amy Margaret was reduced to living in two rented rooms. Patricia Riley sees these events of Sowerby's life reflected in The Stepmother and writes that the play is "suffused with Githa's anger over his irresponsible handling of money." Riley notes that the play was written nearly 40 years after the passage of the Married Women's Property Act which allowed women to control their own property after marriage, but that many women gave power of attorney to their husbands. Sowerby sought to discourage this practice through the play, but notes that the single night's performance meant that the play's message had little opportunity to spread.

== Dramatis Personae ==
- Charlotte Gaydon - Fanny and Eustace's aunt
- Mary
- Eustace Gaydon - Fanny's brother
- Monica Gaydon - Eustace's elder daughter
- Betty Gaydon - Eustace's younger daughter
- Mr. Bennett - Eustace's solicitor
- Lois Relph - Fanny's companion and heir; an orphan
- Cyril Bennett - Mr. Bennett's son; Monica's suitor
- Peter Holland - a neighbor, and later Lois's lover
- Mrs. Geddes
- Butler

== Publication ==
The play was not published in the playwright's lifetime. It had been lost, its discovery in Sowerby's publisher's basement led to the 2008 revival. The play was first published in 2017 by Samuel French. The publication was timed to coincide with the production at the Chichester Festival Theatre.
