= Githa Sowerby =

English playwright, children's writer and member of the Fabian Society

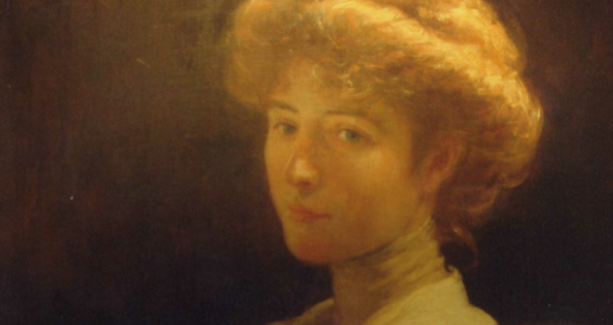
Portrait of Sowerby by George Percy Jacomb-Hood, circa 1912

Katherine Githa Sowerby (6 October 1876 – 30 June 1970), also known under her pen name K. G. Sowerby, was an English playwright, children's writer, and member of the Fabian Society. A feminist, she was well-known during the early twentieth century for her 1912 hit play Rutherford & Son, but lapsed into obscurity in later decades.

Rutherford & Son was first revived in 1980, and since then there have been several productions, including one at the Royal National Theatre in 1994 and, most recently, by Sheffield Theatres. A biography of Sowerby by Pat Riley, Looking for Githa, appeared in 2009, with a revised edition in 2019. In addition to several plays, Sowerby wrote books of poetry and short stories for children, illustrated by her sister Millicent Sowerby. Her papers and memorabilia are in the collections at the Tyne and Wear Archives.

== Life and career ==
Sowerby was born in 1876 in Gateshead, England, into the Sowerbys, a glass-making family. Her father, John G. Sowerby, was an artist and grandson of naturalist James Sowerby, and her mother was Amy Margaret Sowerby (née Hewison). Sowerby married John Kendall, and they had one daughter, Joan (1918–2013)

Rutherford & Son was a "sensation" and a "massive success" in its 1912 London debut, running for 133 performances in London and 63 performances in New York. Literary critic Barrett Harper Clark, writing in 1915, declared it "among the most powerful works of the younger generation". It was also produced in Canada and Australia, and translated into numerous other languages, including German, French, Italian, Russian, and Bohemian. Originally produced under the pen name "G. K. Sowerby", it was only later revealed that the author of the hit play was a woman; Sowerby then achieved instant celebrity. Sowerby's writing was compared to Henrik Ibsen's at that point, while known only by the gender-neutral initials "G. K."

== Bibliography ==
=== Plays ===
- Rutherford and Son (1912, realist drama)
- Before Breakfast (1912)
- Jinny (1914)
- A Man and Some Women (1914)
- Sheila (1917)
- The Stepmother (1924)
- Direct Action (1937–78) (Sowerby's last play)

=== Children's books ===
- The Wise Book (1906)
- The Bumbletoes (1907)
- Childhood (1907)
- The Merry Book (1908)
- Yesterday's Children (1908)
- The Happy Book (1909)
- Grimm's Fairy Tales (retold) (1909)
- Little Plays for Little People (1910)
- Little Songs for Little People (1910)
- My Birthday (1911)
- Poems of Childhood (1912)
- Little Plays for School and Home (1912)
- The Pretty Book (1914)
- Cinderella (1915)
- The Gay Book (1915)
- The Dainty Book (1915)
- The Bright Book (1915)
- The Bonny Book (1918)
- The Glad Book (1921)
