= Millicent Sowerby =

English painter

An illustration by Sowerby for Alice's Adventures in Wonderland (1907)

Amy Millicent Sowerby (1878–1967) was an English painter and illustrator, known for her illustrations of classic children's stories such as Alice's Adventures in Wonderland and A Child's Garden of Verses, her postcards featuring children, nursery rhymes, and Shakespeare scenes, and children's books created with her sister Githa Sowerby.

Sowerby was born in Gateshead, England in 1878 to John G. Sowerby, artist and grandson of naturalist James Sowerby, and Amy Margaret Sowerby (née Hewison). Sowerby, who went by Millicent, was the fourth in a family of six children, including sisters Helen and Katherine Githa and brother Lewis Richard Sowerby (chemical engineer). The family eventually settled in Sutton Courtenay. Millicent took some art classes in Newcastle upon Tyne but was largely self-taught. She initially studied watercolors and landscape painting, before becoming influenced by the work of artists such as Thomas Crane and Kate Greenaway and the Arts and Crafts movement, and pursuing postcard and children's illustration as well as landscapes in oil and watercolours. Her postcard series "Postcards for the Little Ones" was quite popular, consistently selling thousands of copies.

Sowerby was among the earliest women to illustrate Lewis Carroll's Alice's Adventure's in Wonderland, originally published in 1865. In 1907, the book entered the public domain in the United Kingdom, and that year at least eight new editions were published, with Sowerby's being the first of the new lot to appear. A collective review in The Academy of the 1907 editions – while regarding her rendition of the mad-hatter's tea party her best illustration, and Father William replying to his son her best use of color – opined "Sowerby attempts work rather too difficult for her, and she has not much imagination". Her artwork in Childhood, written by her sister Githa, however, was regarded as "much better" than her work in Alice: "The bistre drawings have a charming effect, and [Sowerby] has a pretty fancy." Her illustrations of Robert Louis Stevenson's A Child's Garden of Verses were received as "characteristically excellent", and a 1911 review of three books produced with Githa proclaimed "Millicent Sowerby is Kate Greenaway come to life again."

Sowerby remained unmarried, and continued to paint into her 80s. She died in 1967 at the age of 89.

== See also ==
- Illustrators of Alice's Adventures in Wonderland
- Sowerby family
