= John George Sowerby =

English painter

- Born: 4 July 1849
- Died: 14 December 1914 (aged 65); Herefordshire
- Occupations: painter, illustrator, businessman
- Years active: 1876-1914
- Spouse: Amy Margaret Hewison
- Children: John Lawrence (b. 1873); Margaret Helen (b. 1874); Katherine Githa Sowerby (b. 1876); Amy Millicent Sowerby (b. 1877); Marjory Gladys (b. 1880); Rachel Ruth (b. 1882)

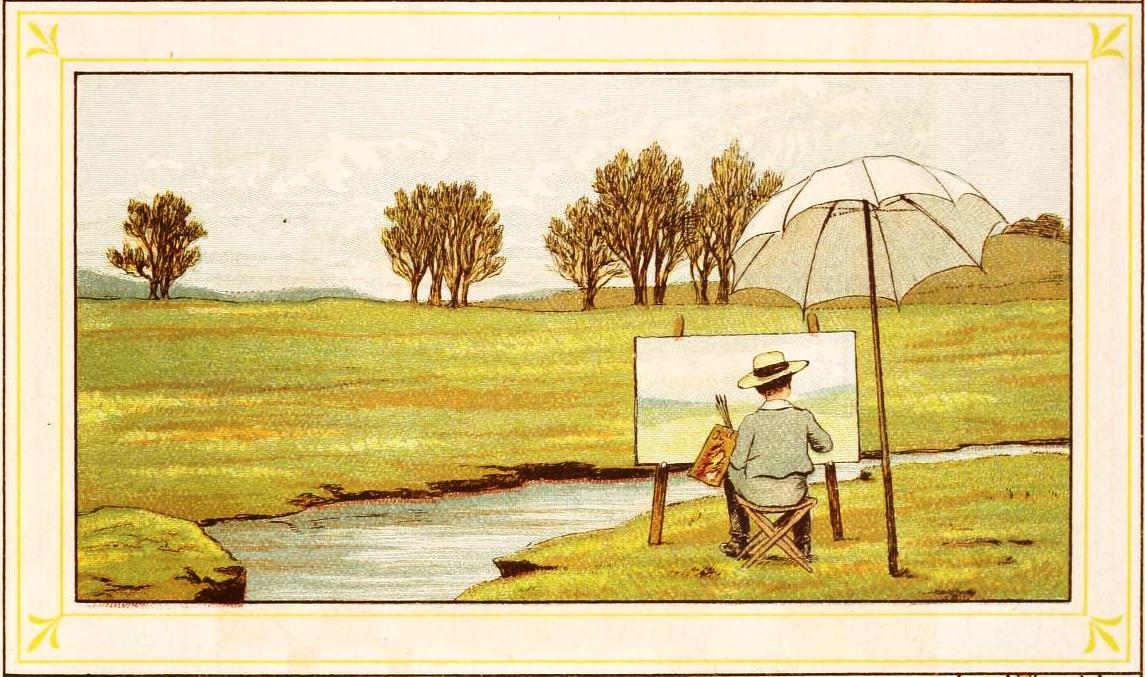
Detail from At Home, 1881

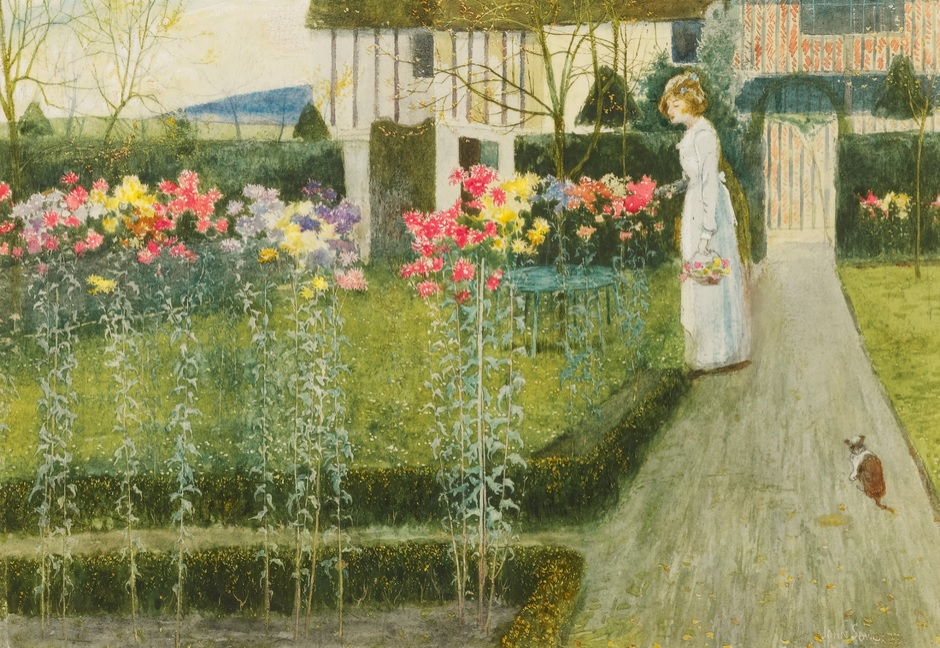
Chrysanthemums, watercolour

John George Sowerby (1849–1914) was an English painter and illustrator from Gateshead, and director of Ellison Glass Works, the Sowerby family business, which during the 1880s was the largest producer of pressed glass in the world. The grandson of naturalist James Sowerby, his paintings were exhibited in the Royal Academy of Arts, and his children's book illustrations were generally well received.

Sowerby's landscapes and floral paintings, while not numerous, were described as showing "a genuine Pre-Raphaelite intensity of vision". He brought designs inspired by the Arts and Crafts movement into Ellison Glassworks. He collaborated with the painter H. H. Emmerson on the 1880 children's book Afternoon Tea, which was generally praised by book reviewers but generated some controversy: artist Kate Greenaway and her supporters viewed it as an inferior imitation of her 1879 picture book Under the Window: a commercial success that inspired a wave of similar books. Sowerby countered that the illustrations were not imitations of Greenaway's art but merely within the same genre. Afternoon Tea also suffered from printing inconsistencies and colour misalignment, the result of somewhat haphazard assembly by three different engraving firms before publication. Two of Sowerby's later children's books however (At Home and At Home Again, each decorated by Thomas Crane), are regarded as superior; described by librarian scholar Roger Dixon as "among the loveliest books ever produced."

Sowerby married Amy Margaret Hewison in 1872. They had one son and five daughters. His daughter Githa Sowerby became a noted playwright and children's book author, with many of her books illustrated by sister Millicent Sowerby, who also illustrated classic nursery rhymes and stories such as Alice's Adventures in Wonderland. She portrayed John Sowerby, as the owner of a failing glassworks in the north-east of England in dispute with his children, in her play Rutherford and Son (1912).

Sowerby died on 14 December 1914 in Herefordshire, to where he had retired.

== Ellison Glass Works ==
Sowerby's family had been in the glass making business since the early 1800s when his grandfather George Sowerby was a partner in the New Stourbridge Glass Works. George Sowerby was succeeded by his son John (John George's father), who opened the larger Ellison's Glass Works in 1852, which took advantage of increased mechanization to increase production and increase profits. John George Sowerby was raised to the family business; in 1871, he began work as a manager and colour-mixer at the age of 22. He patented several innovations in glass-making in the 1870s. In 1880, the Ellison Glass Works became a limited private company, and in 1881, John George Sowerby was elected the first chairman of the board. His tenure as chairman was brief and financially damaging. Two ventures into higher-end artistic glass and pottery produced fine work but lost money, and John George was removed as chairman in November 1883. The loss of income resulted in his bankruptcy. He returned to work at the Glass Works intermittently in the 1880s, and left the company in the early 1890s. In 1896, he severed all ties to the glass works by selling his shares in the company (and thus losing his primary source of income.) It was then that he began to work on painting full time.

== Books ==
- Afternoon Tea: Rhymes for Children. With H. H. Emmerson. London: Frederick Warne & Co., 1880
- At Home. With Thomas Crane. London: Marcus Ward & Co., 1881
- At Home Again. With Thomas Crane and Eliza Keary. London: Marcus Ward & Co., 1883
- Jimmy: Scenes From the Life of a Black Doll. London: George Routledge & Sons., 1888
- Young Maids & Old China. With F. W. Bourdillon. London: Marcus Ward & Co., 1889
- Rooks and their Neighbours. London: Gay & Bird; Newcastle-on-Tyne: Mawson, Swan, & Morgan, 1895
