= The Nursery "Alice" =

1890 novel by Lewis Carroll

The Nursery “Alice”
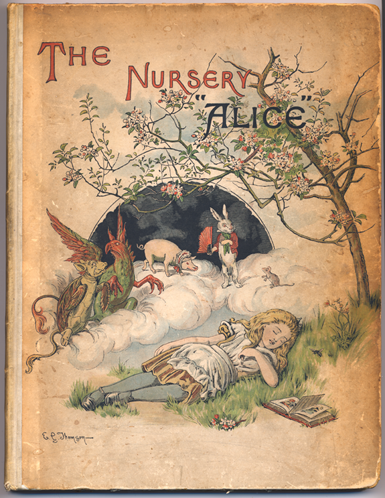
- First edition cover of The Nursery “Alice”
- Author: Lewis Carroll
- Illustrator: John Tenniel
- Cover artist: E. Gertrude Thomson
- Language: English
- Genre: Fantasy novel
- Publisher: Macmillan
- Publication date: 1890
- Publication place: United Kingdom
- Media type: Print (Hardback)
- Pages: 72 pp

The Nursery "Alice" (1889/90) is an abridged version of Alice's Adventures in Wonderland (1865) by Lewis Carroll, adapted by the author himself for children "from nought to five". It includes 20 of John Tenniel's illustrations from the original book, redrawn, enlarged, coloured – and, in some cases, revised – by Tenniel himself. The book was published by Macmillan a quarter-century after the original Alice. It features new illustrated front and back covers in full colour by E. Gertrude Thomson, who was a good friend of Carroll. The book was 'engraved and printed' by the famous colour printer Edmund Evans.

The work is not merely a shortened and simplified version, along the lines of J. C. Gorham's 1905 Alice's Adventures in Wonderland retold in words of one syllable. It is written as though the story is being read aloud by someone who is also talking to the child listener, with many interpolations by the author, pointing out details in the pictures and asking questions, such as "Which would you have liked the best, do you think, to be a little tiny Alice, no larger than a kitten, or a great tall Alice, with your head always knocking against the ceiling?" There are also additions, such as an anecdote about a puppy called Dash, and an explanation of the word "foxglove".
