= Rutherford and Son =

1912 play by Githa Sowerby

Rutherford and Son is a play by Githa Sowerby (1876–1970), written in 1912. It premiered in London in the same year with four matinee performances at the Royal Court followed by a run of 133 performances at the Vaudeville Theatre. The production was directed by Norman McKinnel who also took the role of Rutherford. The same production opened at the Little Theater, New York, on Christmas Eve, 1912 and ran for 63 performances. The Times theatre critic, Arthur Bingham Walkley, called it "a play not easily forgotten, and full of promise for the future as well as of merit in itself", while the Saturday Review thought it showed "what can be done in the modern theatre by keeping strictly to the point." Journalist Keble Howard, after an interview with Sowerby in 1912, wrote that, "Rutherford and Son is a marvellous achievement...".

== Plot ==
Rutherford, "a bull-headed capitalist who crushes his own children beneath the wheels of industry" has built a glassmaking business which he has always intended to pass onto his son, John. He sent John to Harrow School to have him educated as a gentleman, but to his disgust John turned his back on the business and went to London, where he married a working-class girl, Mary. When John and Mary had a child, Tony, they could not afford to feed and look after the baby properly, and they have come back to live in Rutherford's house. Rutherford dominates the household, consisting of Ann, his sister, and his children John, Richard and Janet; he barely acknowledges Mary's existence.

John, trained in chemistry, has developed a metal which he believes can save the business a great deal of money; but rather than giving it to his father to benefit the business, he regards it as his to sell to make his fortune. He tries to sell it to his father, who turns him down as he believes that John owes him it both in return for bringing him up and to benefit the business which will ultimately come to John. To support his estimation of the value of his invention, John says that he has shared it with his father's right-hand man Martin, whose opinion of it was favourable.

Martin is seen sharing a passionate kiss with Rutherford's daughter Janet, and they arrange a further meeting in secret.

Rutherford's other son Richard (Dick), who is a curate, comes to ask his father's permission to leave the house and take a position in Blackpool. He also asks his father to see Mrs Henderson, the mother of a lad Rutherford has sacked. During the course of an acrimonious discussion she tells him that Janet and Martin are carrying on. After Dick has gone, Rutherford summons Martin from the mill, and persuades him to betray John's trust and give him the recipe. He argues that this is needed to save the business, which he tells him has been losing money for seven years.

When Martin has left, Janet comes in and Rutherford asks her how long it has been going on. She does not attempt to deny the affair, and tells her father what she has long wanted to say to him about her life and how he bullies her and her brothers. Rutherford tells her that she may stay the night, but when he comes home tomorrow she is to be gone and will never be mentioned in the house again.

In the morning Janet is euphoric about her coming freedom and new life with Martin. Martin comes in dazed: after he delivered the recipe, Rutherford dismissed him. He does not respond to Janet's euphoria at all; but he says he will make an honest woman of her, and tries to give her some money. She eventually realises that her dream is not to be, and leaves the house alone.

Martin has come not to see Janet, but to tell John that he has betrayed him. John is furious and despairs, thinking that his one hope of a life of his own has vanished. He steals all the money he finds in his father's desk, against his wife's begging him not to: he is convinced that by right it is his. He is talking of their going to Canada to make a new life; but Mary persuades him that it is better for him to go alone, and send for her and Tony when he is established.

With all three children gone, Mary speaks up to Rutherford, and offers him a bargain: if he will keep and clothe her and her son for ten years, she will then hand the boy over to him entirely to be trained to take over the business. Rutherford accepts, and tells her "I'm known as a hard man. But I don't know that I could have stood there and spoken as you have".

== Revival and later productions ==
After its initial success Rutherford and Son dropped out of sight, although the BBC Home Service broadcast a radio version in its Saturday Night Theatre slot on 29 November 1952, starring the Lancashire-born actors Frank Pettingell and Belle Chrystall. The play's modern revival did not get underway until 1980 when a production by the feminist theatre company Mrs Worthington's Daughters (directed by Julie Holledge) was staged at the Royal Court Upstairs before going on tour. Since then, there have been major productions at the New End Theatre, Hampstead (directed by Wyn Jones) in 1988; the Stephen Joseph Theatre, Scarborough (directed by Alan Ayckbourn) in 1991; the Royal National Theatre (directed by Katie Mitchell) in 1994; the Mint Theater Company, New York (2001 and 2012); the Salisbury Playhouse (directed by Joanna Read) in 2001; the Shaw Festival, Ontario (directed by Jackie Maxwell) in 2004; the Royal Exchange, Manchester (directed by Sarah Frankcom) in 2005, and a production by Threshold Theatre at Northern Stage, Newcastle upon Tyne (directed by Richard Beecham) in 2009 – the first professional production on Tyneside, where the play is set. In 2013 Jonathan Miller directed a Northern Broadsides production with some adaptations to the text by Blake Morrison. Rutherford was played by the company founder Barrie Rutter. The production toured the UK and had a short run in the West End at the St James Theatre. In 2019 Cody Holliday Haefner directed a production with the University of Washington School of Drama at the Jones Playhouse, Seattle. Also in 2019 Caroline Steinbeis directed a production at the Crucible Theatre, Sheffield and a production by Polly Findlay opened at the National Theatre, with Roger Allam in the title-role. In 1998, Rutherford and Son was included in the list of the top one hundred plays of the twentieth century by the Royal National Theatre.
