= E. Gertrude Thomson =

British artist and illustrator (1850–1929)

E. G. Thomson - Momus 1880 Manchester Central Library

Emily Gertrude Thomson (1850–1929) was a British artist and illustrator.

== Biography ==
Thomson was born in Glasgow. She was the daughter of the Rev. Alexander Thomson (1815–1895), a minister and professor of Greek and Hebrew. After being home-schooled, she studied at Manchester School of Art, where she won several medals for her art. In 1878 she was approached by Charles Dodgson (Lewis Carroll) to illustrate some of his books, including Three Sunsets and Other Poems: she also designed the cover for Carroll's 1890 book The Nursery "Alice", and became a friend of Dodgson and wrote a short biographical memoir of him. After studying at the Manchester School of Art she attended the studio of Frederic Shields and they became lifelong friends. Emily also studied for some time at Messrs. Wedgwood’s works at Etruria in Staffordshire painting on china.

Thomson became a member of the Royal Miniature Society in 1912. She exhibited in Manchester, Liverpool, Brussels and Canada; both Manchester Art Gallery and the Victoria and Albert Museum in London own examples of her work. At various points of her career she painted portraits, illustrated books and designed stained glass.

== Stained glass ==
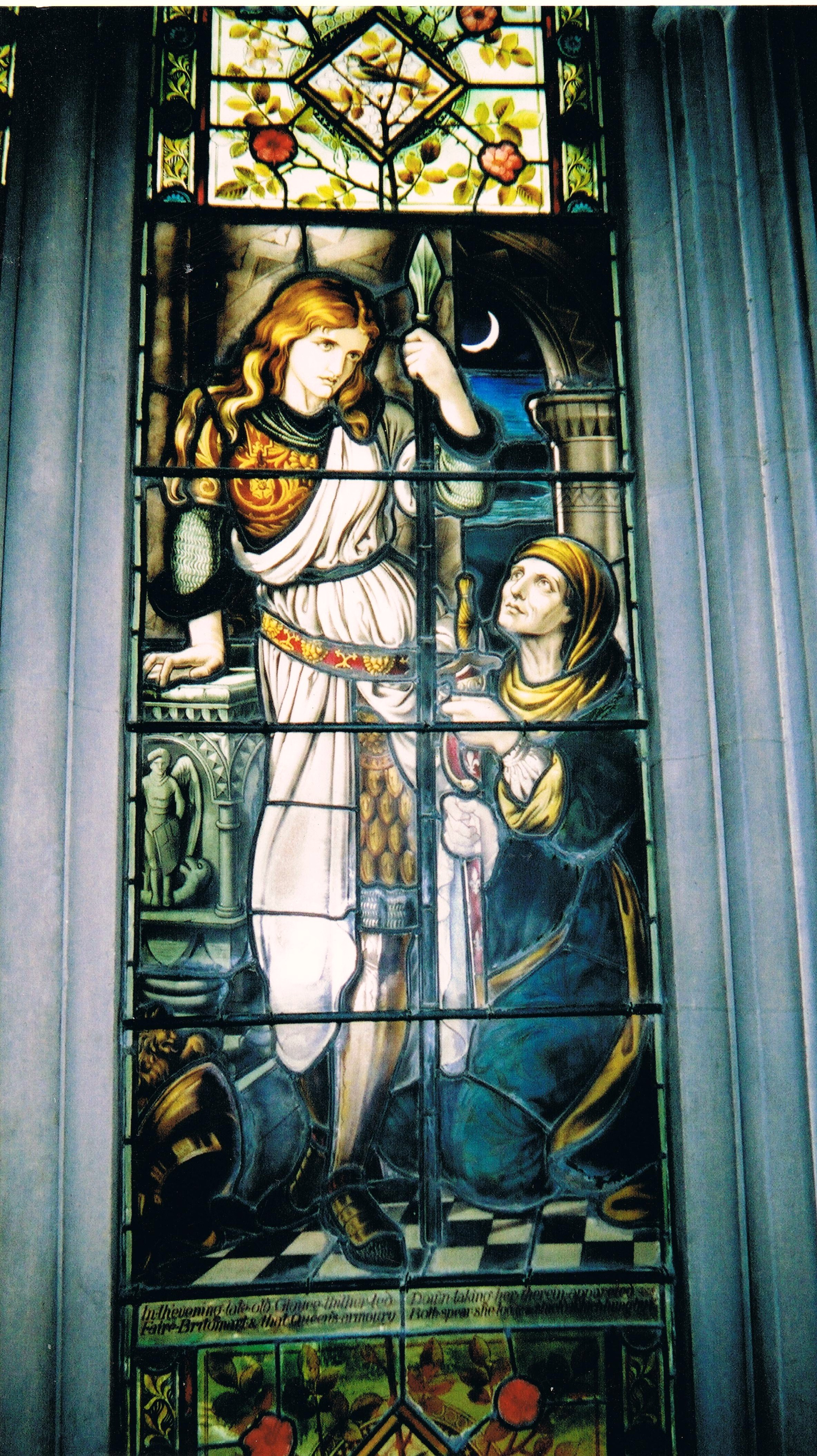
The Lady Knight, one of the Britomart Windows at Cheltenham Ladies’ College

Thomson's stained glass windows can be seen at the Church of St John the Divine, Brooklands in Cheshire, and at Cheltenham Ladies’ College. The Britomart Windows at Cheltenham Ladies’ College are based upon six pictures taken from Edmund Spenser’s allegory of The Faerie Queene. They were produced by Heaton, Butler and Bayne. Thomson designed four of the windows including the Lady Knight and Frederic Shields designed two – the first and the fifth.

== Illustrations ==
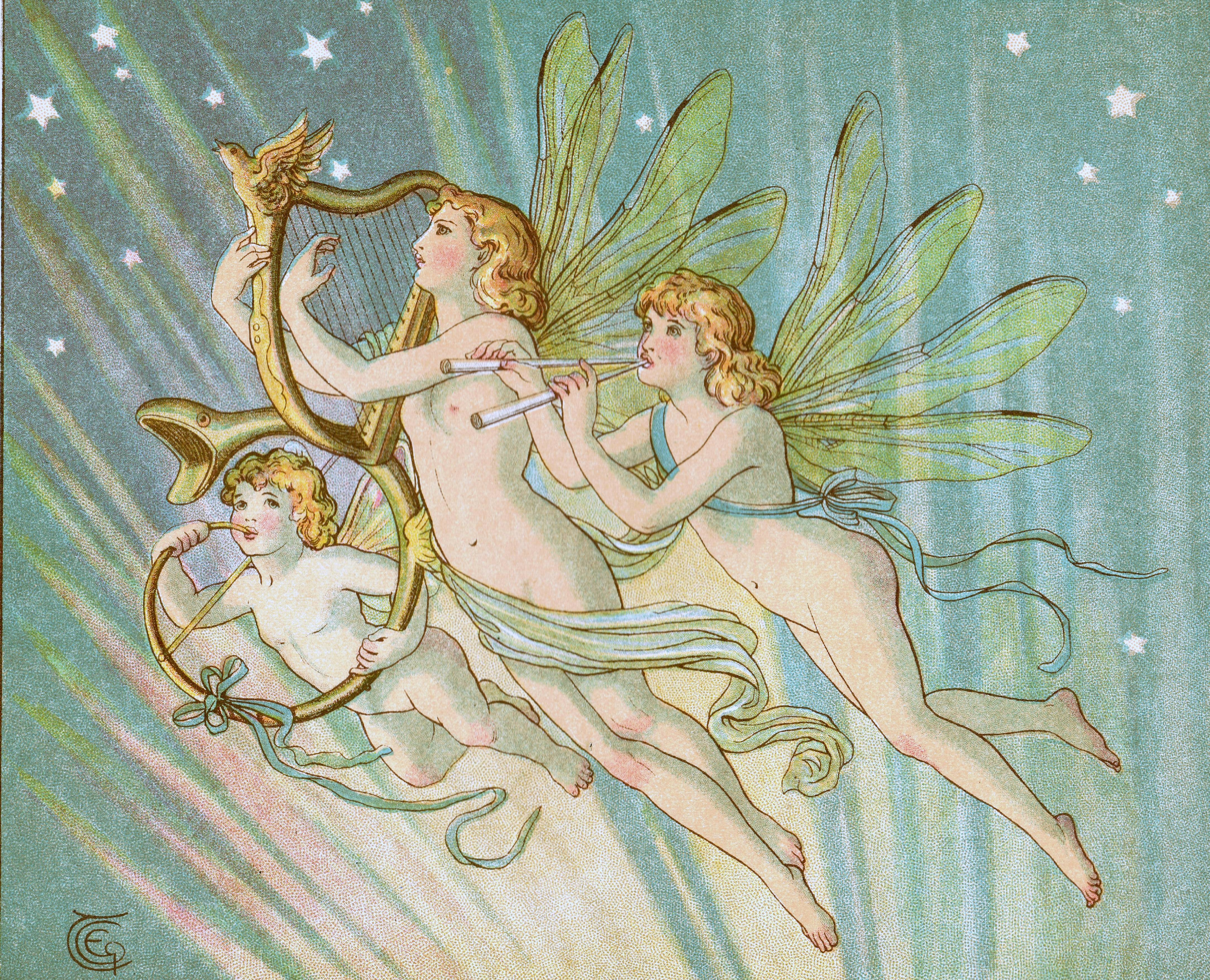
The Fairies, illustration

Thomson became an illustrator with numerous different commissions - one being: The Fairies – A Child’s Song, written by William Allingham who was part of the Rossetti Circle.

The Fairies was one of Dodgson’s favourite books. When he saw Thomson's work he contacted her and asked her to do some illustrations for him, but she took so long on the cover for The Nursery "Alice" that in the end the book went to press initially without it. In between Thomson's front and back covers, it contained twenty illustrations by John Tenniel which were coloured by Thomson. Thomson and Dodgson not only became working colleagues, but close friends right up to Dodgson’s death.

== Portraits ==
Thomson produced many fine portraits and was a member of the Royal Miniature Society. She also drew a number of Russian refugees for illustrations, including Prince Kropotkin, in Charles Rowley’s book Fifty Years of Work Without Wages.

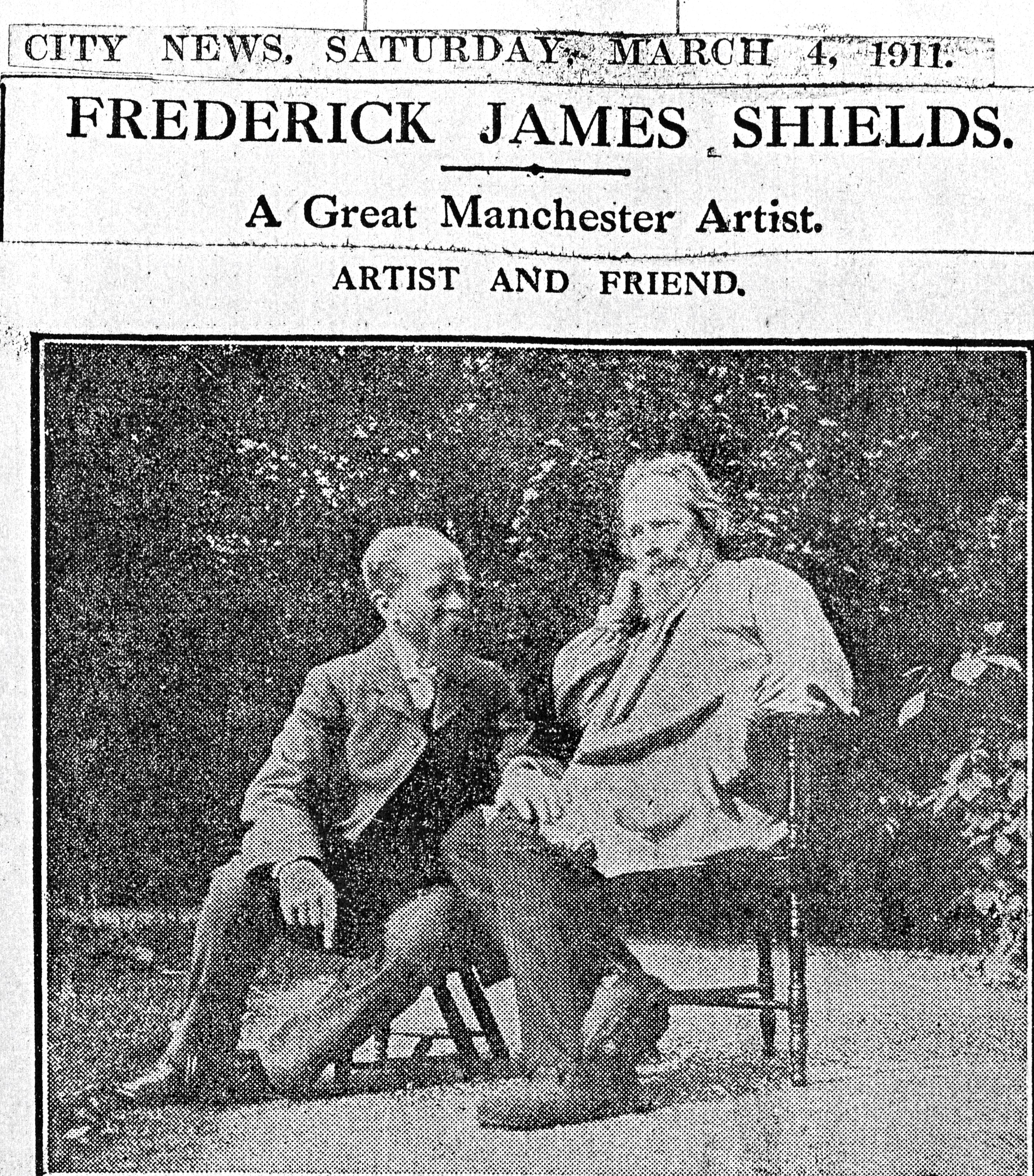
Charles Rowley and Frederic Shields in his garden, photographed by Emily Thomson

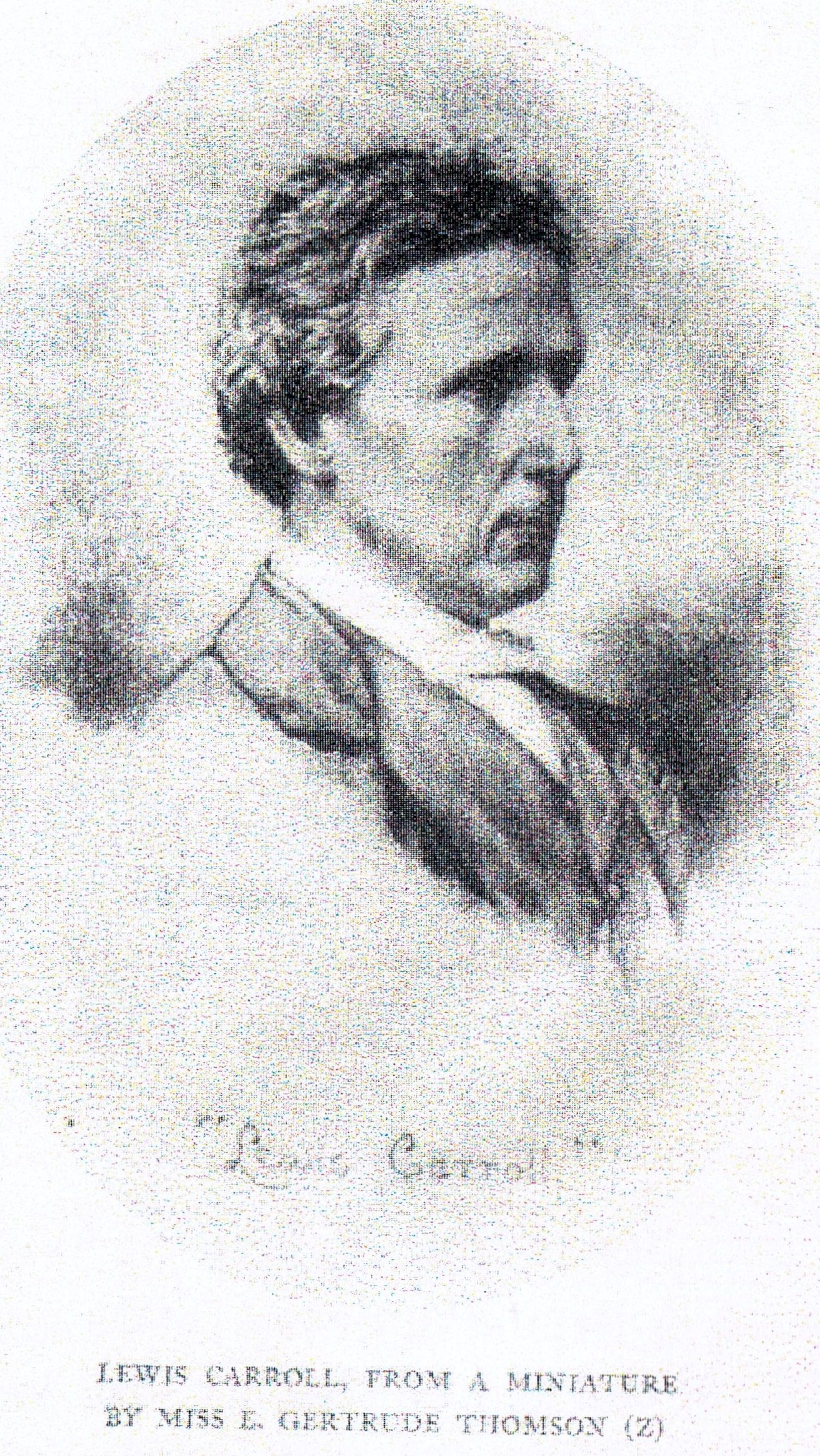
Miniature of Lewis Carroll.

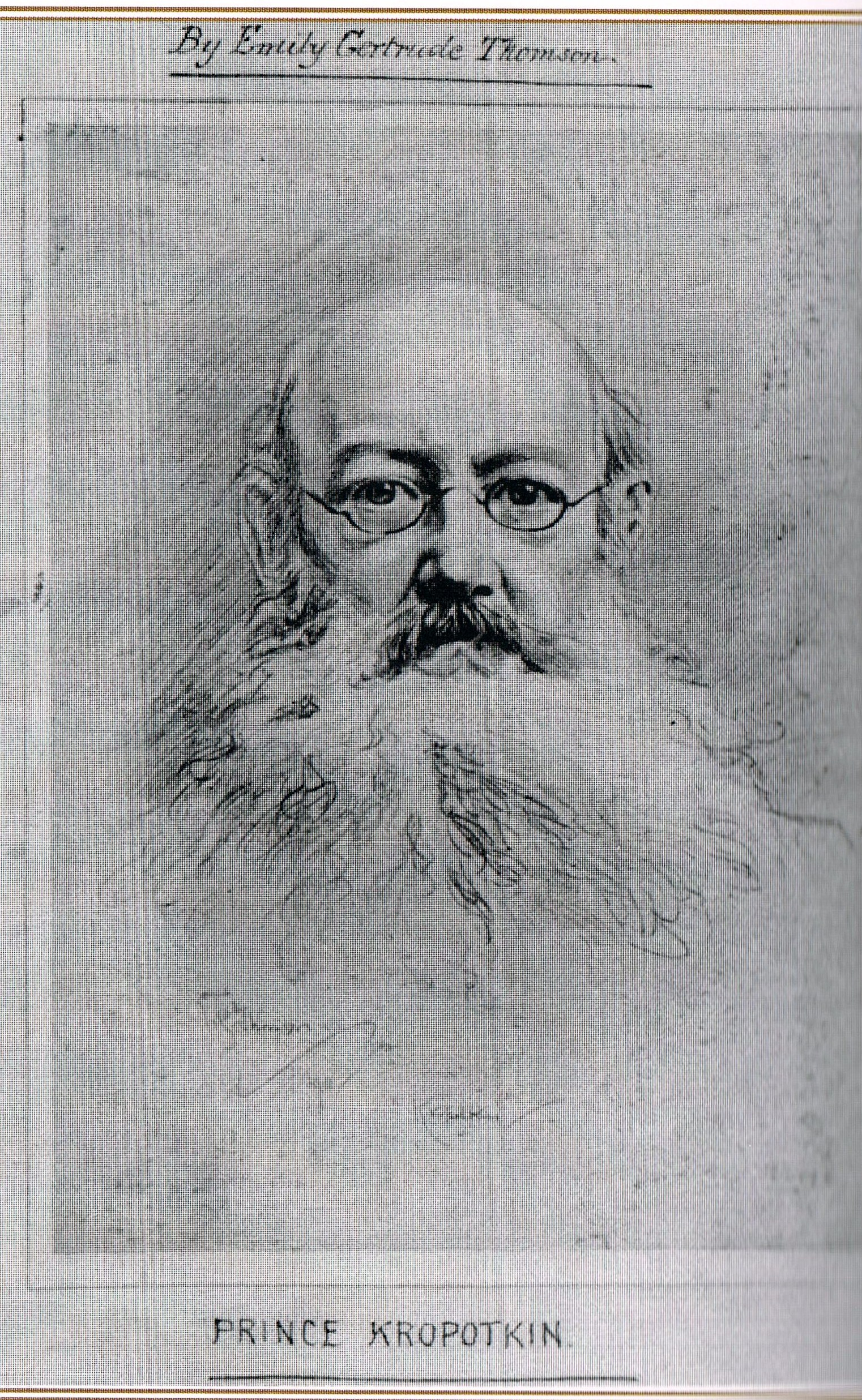
Prince Kropotkin, drawing
