= Grubb Parsons =

Historic manufacturer of telescopes

Sir Howard Grubb, Parsons and Co. Ltd.
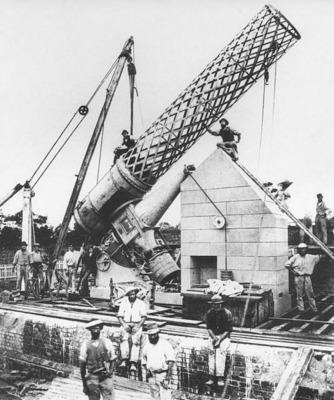
- Grubb's Great Melbourne Telescope, then the largest steerable telescope in the world, being installed in 1868
- Trade name: Grubb Parsons
- Formerly: Grubb Telescope Company
- Industry: Optical engineering
- Founded: 1833 in Dublin, Ireland
- Founder: Thomas Grubb
- Defunct: 1985
- Headquarters: Dublin (1833-1918); St Albans (1918-25); Newcastle (1925-85)
- Key people: Howard Grubb; Charles Parsons
- Products: Telescopes; Periscopes; Lenses
- Number of employees: 150 (1955)
- Parent: C.A. Parsons & Company (1925-85)

Grubb Parsons (legally 'Sir Howard Grubb, Parsons and Co. Ltd.') was a historic manufacturer of telescopes, active in the 19th and 20th centuries. They built numerous large research telescopes, including several that were (at the time of construction) the largest in the world of their type.

It was founded in 1833 by Thomas Grubb as the Grubb Telescope Company, located in Dublin. Control of the company passed to his son Howard Grubb in the 1860s. They produced dozens of telescopes, including some of the largest of the 19th century, such as the 48-inch (1.2 m) Great Melbourne Telescope (a reflecting telescope) in 1868, a 27-inch (0.69 m) refractor for the Vienna Observatory in 1878, and the Greenwich 28 inch refractor in 1893. Leading up to and during the First World War (1914-18) the company produced periscopes for submarines and moved to St Albans in 1918.

In 1925 the company was purchased by Charles Algernon Parsons, renamed Grubb Parsons, and moved to Newcastle upon Tyne. In the 20th century they produced large research telescopes including the Isaac Newton Telescope (1965), Anglo-Australian Telescope (1965) and UK Infrared Telescope (1979). Their final project was the William Herschel Telescope in 1985, after which the company shut down.

== Grubb Telescope Company ==
=== Under Thomas Grubb ===
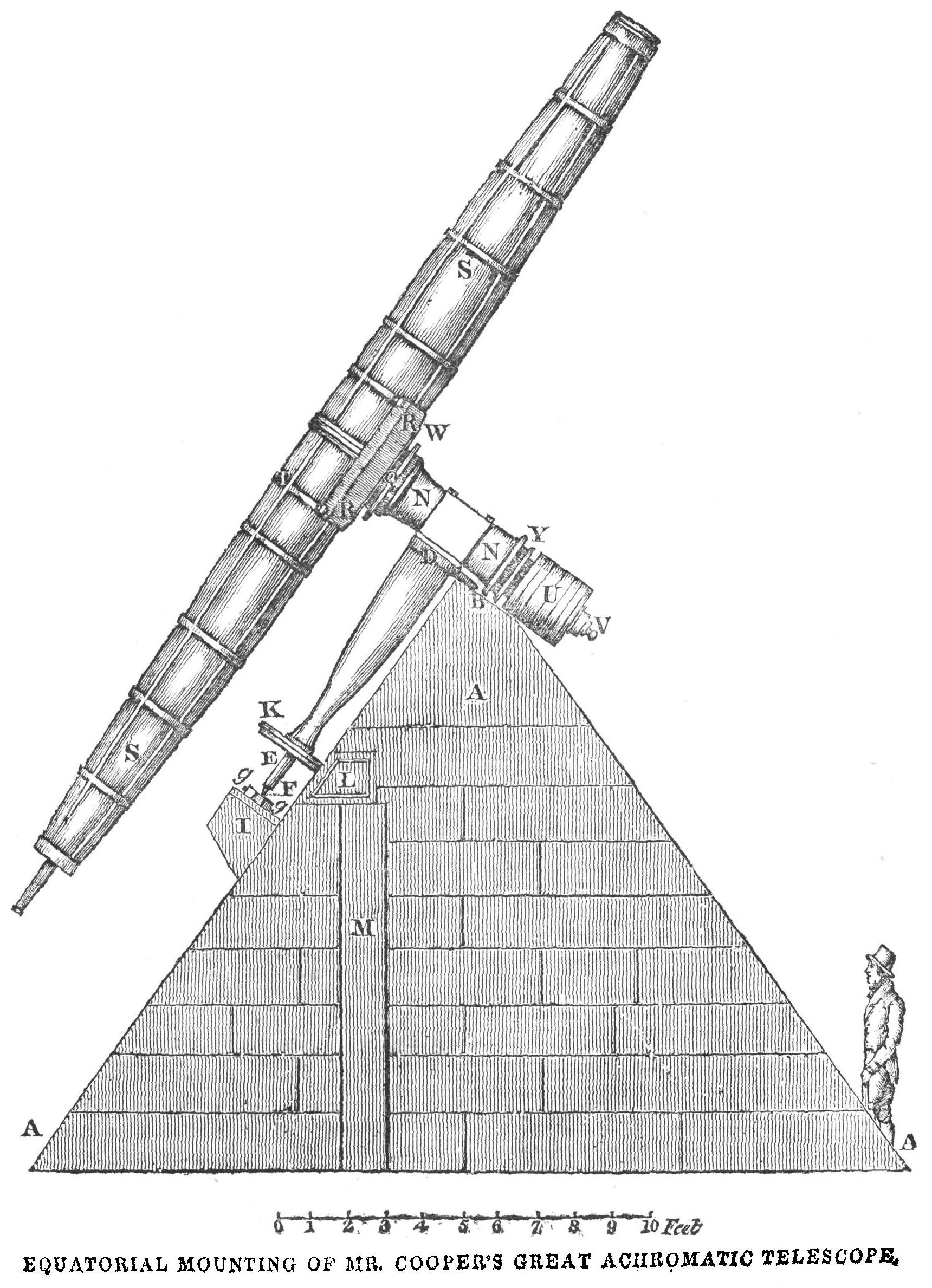
Engraving of the equatorial mount for the 13-inch telescope at Markree Observatory, Thomas Grubb's first commission

The Grubb Telescope Company was founded in Dublin by the Irish engineer Thomas Grubb in 1833. He ran a precision engineering company whose cast iron products included billiard tables and printing presses for banknotes. Grubb had a personal interest in optics and was a friend of the Irish astronomer Thomas Romney Robinson. His first foray into telescope construction was his own 9-inch (230 mm) refractor, which he operated as a public observatory in Portobello, Dublin, as a visitor attraction.

The company's first order was the mount for the 13.3-inch (340 mm) telescope at Markree Observatory, completed in 1834 as the largest refracting telescope in the world. Edward Joshua Cooper, the owner of Markree Castle, had purchased the optics from Robert-Aglaé Cauchoix of Paris and commissioned Grubb (on Robinson's recommendation) to construct the mechanical supports. Grubb provided an equatorial mount that could track targets automatically using a clock drive; although this was not the first telescope with an equatorial mount, it was far larger than previous examples. This was followed in 1835 by a 15-inch (380 mm) reflecting telescope for Armagh Observatory (run by Robinson), which used the Cassegrain layout and another equatorial mount. The combination of an equatorial mount with the Cassegrain layout was innovative and had not been used on large telescopes before; it was widely adopted thereafter.

Orders from outside Ireland soon followed, including the 6.7-inch (170 mm) Sheepshanks equatorial refractor for the Royal Observatory, Greenwich (London, 1838) and a 6.0-inch (150 mm) refractor for the United States Military Academy (West Point, 1840), both using lenses that had been produced by Cauchoix in Paris. In the 1850s and 60s, the company also produced compound microscopes.

=== Under Howard Grubb ===
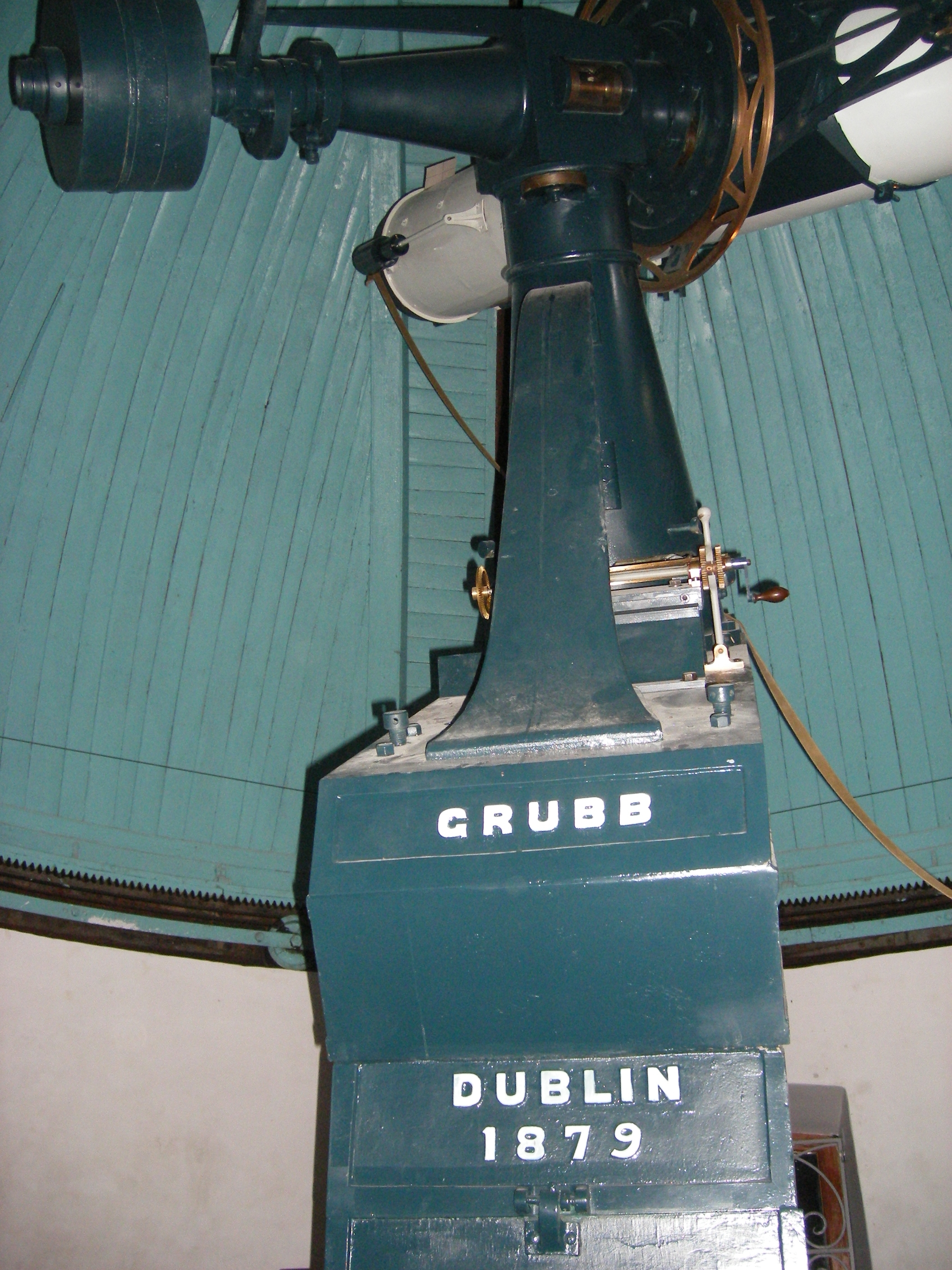
Base of the 12-inch refracting telescope at V. P. Engel'gardt Astronomical Observatory, built in 1875 by the Grubb Telescope Company.

With Thomas Grubb approaching retirement, in 1865 he was joined in managing the company by his son Howard Grubb. Thomas Grubb retired in 1868 and died in 1878. Howard Grubb solidified the company's reputation for high-quality optical instruments, and was knighted in 1887.

The Grubbs contributed to the early development of astronomical spectroscopy by producing various spectroscopes. Surviving examples include spectroscopes with two and six prisms (the latter completed in 1867).

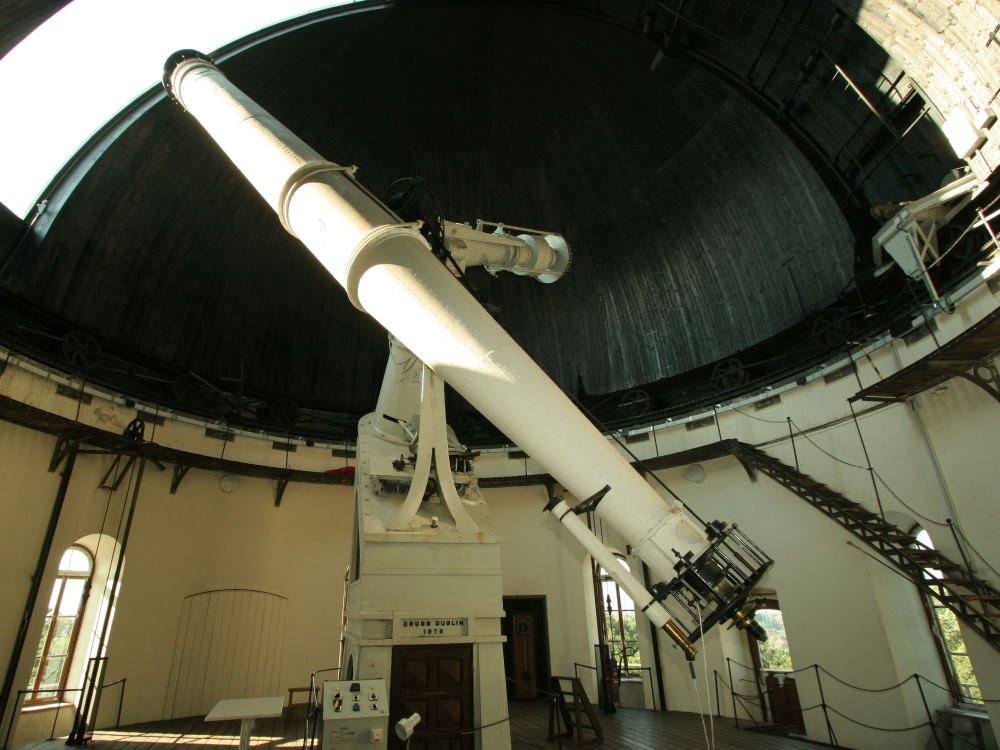
The 27-inch refractor at the Vienna Observatory, built by the Grubb Telescope Company in 1878.

In 1868 the company completed the 48-inch (1.2 m) Great Melbourne Telescope, one of the last large instruments to use a speculum primary mirror. It was the second largest telescope in the world at that time, and the largest that was fully steerable. In 1871 they produced a 18-inch (0.46 m) reflector, also using speculum, for the private observatory of William Huggins at Tulse Hill. A 24-inch (0.61 m) reflector was produced for Royal Observatory, Edinburgh (1872, at Calton Hill Observatory). The company constructed a 27-inch (0.69 m) refractor for the Vienna Observatory in 1878, which was then the largest refractor in the world and regarded as being of high optical quality.

The Melbourne and Vienna telescopes substantially enhanced the reputation of the company, leading to numerous orders for new telescopes. Some of the largest constructed in this period included a 24-inch (0.61 m) for the private observatory of William Edward Wilson (1881, Daramona House, Ireland); a 19-inch (0.48 m) heliostat for the Smithsonian Astrophysical Observatory (1890, Washington DC, USA); and the 28-inch (0.71 m) refractor at the Royal Observatory, Greenwich (1893, still the largest refractor in the UK). In 1887 Grubb's firm built seven identical astrographs for the international Carte du Ciel project; the 13 inch refracting telescopes were designed to produce uniform photographic plates. In 1896 they produced a 30-inch (0.76 m) reflector for the Royal Observatory, Greenwich. The company produced an 18/24-inch double refractor for the Royal Observatory, Cape of Good Hope (South Africa, 1897) and a copy for the Radcliffe Observatory (Oxford, 1901).

After the submarine periscope was invented in 1902, Howard Grubb patented several improvements to their design. The Grubb factory began manufacturing the new instruments, which became their primary business by 1914. During the First World War, most British submarines were equipped with a periscope built by Grubb; following the 1916 Easter Rising in Dublin, the periscope workshop was moved to St Albans in 1918 for better security. When the military contracts ended and peace returned in 1919, the company struggled to return to profitability. Howard Grubb, then in his 70s, attempted to revive the sale of large telescopes but the company began to lose money. Several telescopes had been delayed or not completed due to the war, such as a 24-inch (0.61 m) reflector for the National Astronomical Observatory of Chile (Santiago), which had been ordered in 1909, partially constructed in 1913, but was not operational until 1925.

== Grubb Parsons ==
The Grubb Parsons 36" telescope at the Royal Observatory Edinburgh

In 1925, with Howard Grubb aged 81 and the company on the verge of bankruptcy, it was sold to Charles Parsons. Parsons was an Anglo-Irish engineer with family connections to telescope making – Parson's father William Parsons had constructed the Leviathan of Parsonstown (the largest telescope in the world from 1845-1917). The families had been friends for two generations. Charles Parsons renamed the company Grubb Parsons and moved the factory to Newcastle-upon-Tyne, where his other engineering companies were already located.

The first large telescope completed under the new management (though not the first ordered) was a 36-inch (0.91 m) reflector for the Royal Observatory Edinburgh, which saw first light in 1930. A year later the Royal Greenwich Observatory ordered a copy of this instrument, which was constructed as the Yapp telescope. In 1931 the company provided both a 40-inch (1.0 m) reflector and a 24/20-inch double refractor for the new site of the Stockholm Observatory (Sweden).

Charles Parsons died in 1931, but Grubb Parsons remained a subsidiary of his engineering business, C. A. Parsons and Company. In 1938, the company acquired the telescope manufacturing arm of Cooke, Troughton & Simms.

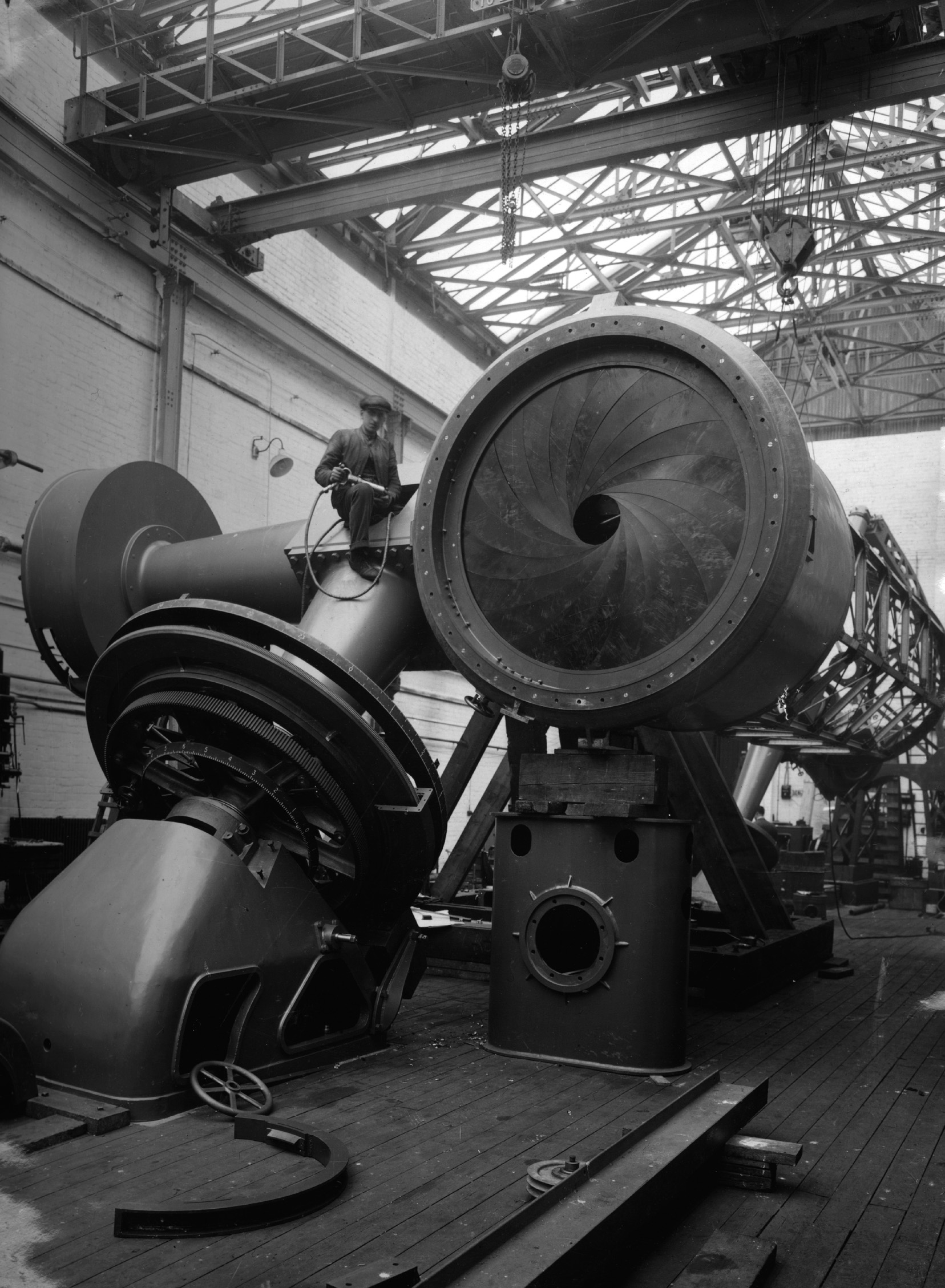
The 74-inch for David Dunlap Observatory, under construction in Grubb Parsons' workshop in Newcastle

The company found the standardisation of designs to be profitable, so continued the approach with a series of six near-identical 74-inch (1.9 m) telescopes for the David Dunlap Observatory (Ontario, Canada, 1935), Radcliffe Observatory (South Africa, construction completed 1938 but first light delayed until after the Second World War), Mount Stromlo Observatory (Canberra, Australia, 1955), Haute-Provence Observatory (France, 1956, with a metric 1.93-metre (76 in) mirror), Okayama Observatory (Japan, 1960) and Helwan Observatory (Egypt, 1963). They continued to produce numerous smaller telescopes in this period, including a 36-inch (0.91 m) for Cambridge Observatory (UK, 1955), a 40-inch (1.0 m) for the South African Astronomical Observatory (1963), and a 48-inch (1.2 m) for Dominion Astrophysical Observatory (Victoria, Canada, 1961).

The next major project was the 98-inch (2.49 m) Isaac Newton Telescope for Royal Greenwich Observatory, which had moved to Herstmonceux Castle, completed in 1965. The location was later deemed unsuitable, so from 1979-84 this telescope was moved to Roque de los Muchachos Observatory in the Canary Islands, during which Grubb Parsons upgraded it with a 100-inch (2.54 m) mirror.

The company began to concentrate on optical systems, not mechanical designs, producing thousands of small mirrors, lenses and prisms for spectrometers as well as small telescopes. They ground and polished the primary mirror for the 3.9-metre (150 in) Anglo-Australian Telescope (AAT) (at Siding Spring Observatory, Australia), which was completed in 1965, though its design and mounting were completed by other companies. Grubb Parsons also produced the 49-inch (1.2 m) UK Schmidt Telescope in 1973, located adjacent to the AAT. They produced the optical components of the 3.8-metre (150 in) UK Infrared Telescope (1979, then the largest infrared telescope in the world), but not the mechanical parts. Smaller telescopes produced by Grubb Parsons in this period included the 1.0-metre (39 in) Jacobus Kapteyn Telescope (Roque de los Muchachos Observatory, 1979) and the optics for the 60-inch (1.5 m) Danish National Telescope (La Silla Observatory, Chile, 1976).

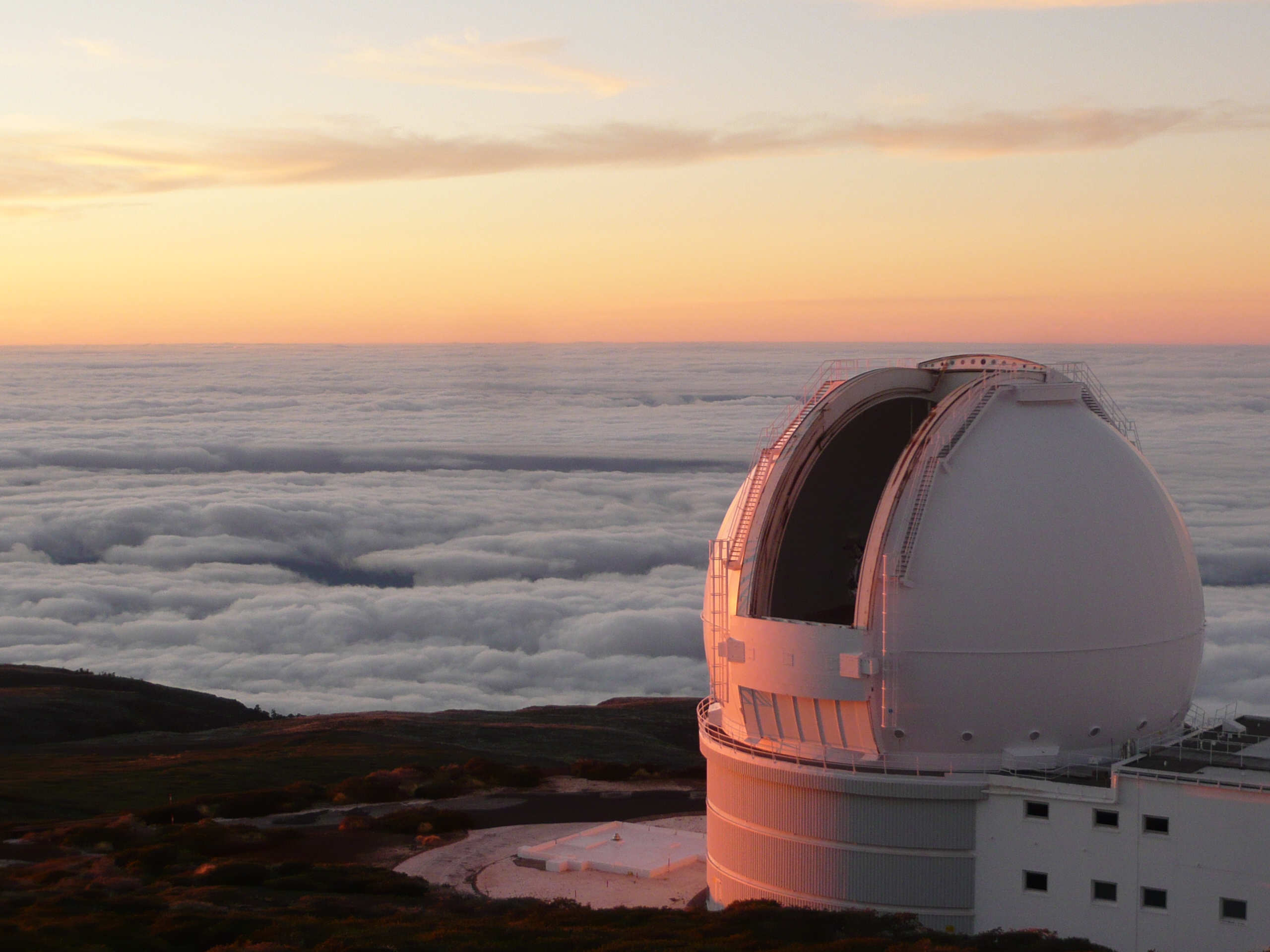
The William Herschel Telescope in the Canary Islands, Spain.

The company traded until 1985, with its last project being the 4.2-metre (170 in) William Herschel Telescope.

== Historiography ==
The surviving archives of the company are held at the Tyne and Wear Archives, part of the Discovery Museum in Newcastle.

Ian Glass, a historian of astronomy, wrote a history of the company under the management of Thomas and Howard Grubb, based mostly on their letters. Glass also produced catalogues of the telescopes known to have been produced by Grubb and by Grubb Parsons.

A partial history of the company under Parsons was written by its last managing director, George Sisson.

== See also ==
- List of largest optical telescopes in the 19th century
- List of largest optical telescopes in the 20th century
- T. Cooke & Sons - contemporary British telescope company, founded in 1837
