= Markree Castle =

Castle located in Collooney, County Sligo, Ireland

Coordinates: 54.174286°N 8.46147°W

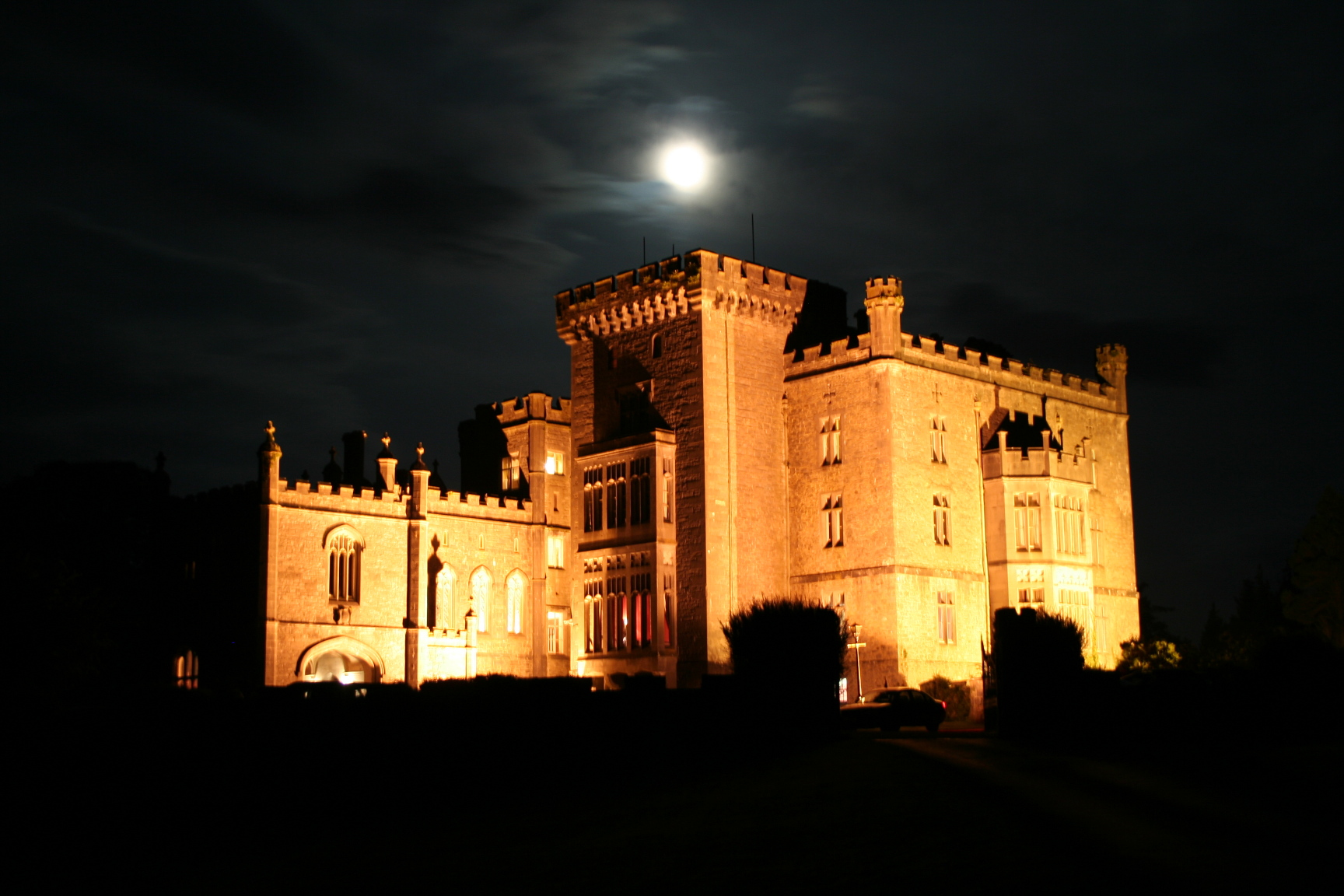
Markree Castle

Markree Castle is a castle located in Collooney, County Sligo, Ireland. It is the ancestral seat of the Cooper family, partially moated by the River Unshin. Today it is a small family-run hotel.

In the 1830s the Observatory on the grounds of the Castle had the largest refracting telescope in the world. What today is known as the asteroid 9 Metis was discovered there in the 1840s by the Coopers' observatory staff.

== History ==
=== 17th century ===
Sketch from 1860

In 1663 Cornet Edward Cooper, who served under Cromwell when his army defeated the O'Brien Clan, was allotted the original 14th-century Markree Castle and the surrounding lands. Until then, Markree had been a fortified outpost of the Irish McDonagh Clan, guarding the ford across the river Unsin.

Conor O'Brien died in this battle, and Edward married his widow Marie Rua (Red Mary). With her two sons they went to live at Dromoland Castle. One son, Donough, was left Dromoland and the other inherited Markree. Charles Cooper, the last of the Cooper family to own Markree Castle, is a direct descendant of this son.

Times remained turbulent, and during an attempt by the English King James to regain the throne, the Catholic army occupied Markree Castle and the Coopers had to flee. Following the Battle of the Boyne in 1690, they returned and have been resident ever since, except for a brief period during the Civil War in the 1920s when Markree was again occupied, this time by the Irish Free State army.

=== 19th century ===
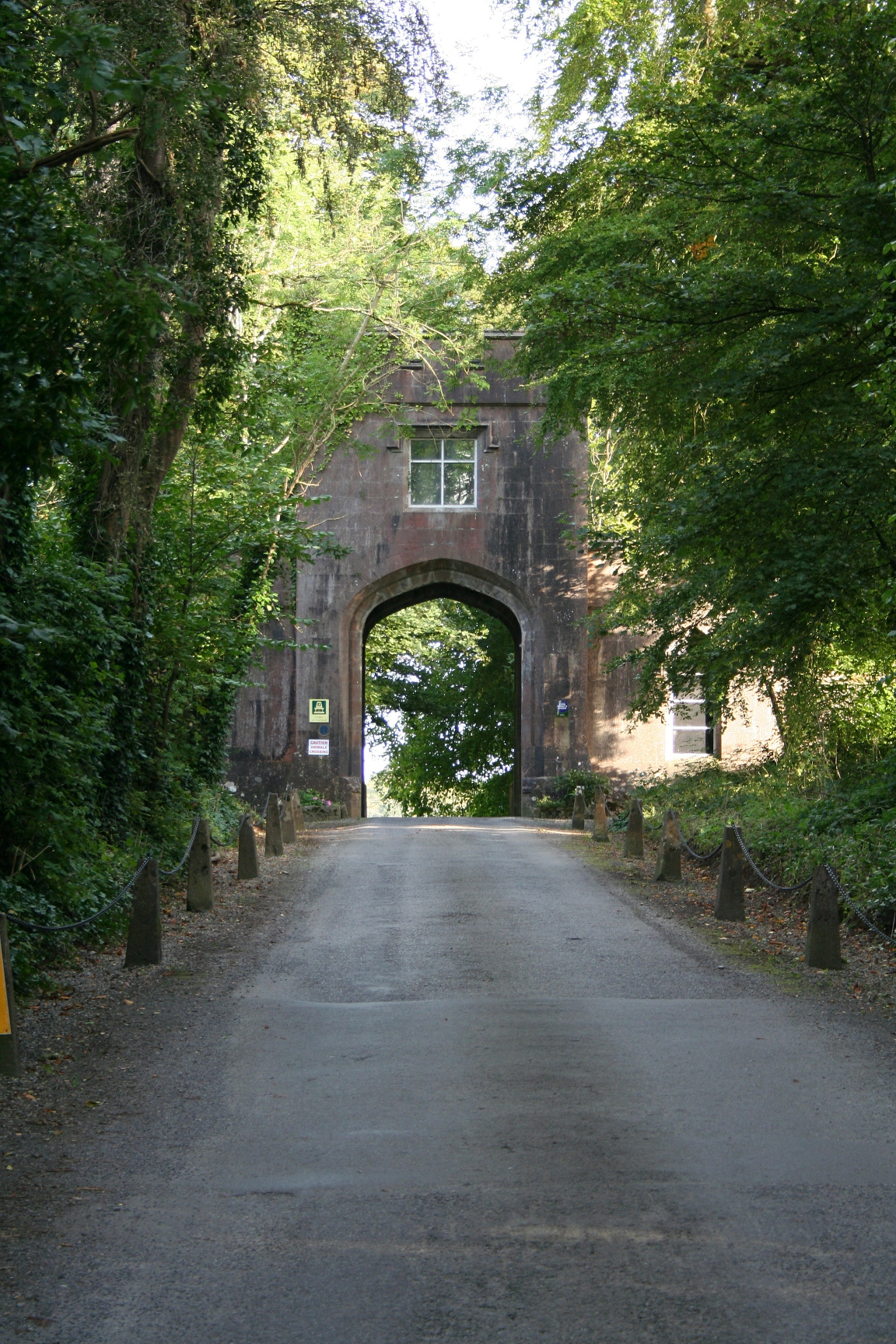
The entrance gate

In 1830, Col. Edward Joshua Cooper MP (1798–1863) eldest son of Edward Synge Cooper MP, and Ann, daughter of Henry Vansittart, Governor of Bengal set up Markree Observatory in the castle grounds. For a number of years Cooper's telescope was the largest in the world.

"The Observatory of Mr Cooper of Markree Castle – undoubtedly the most richly furnished private observatory known – is worked with great activity by Mr Cooper himself and by his very able assistant, Mr Andrew Graham." (Royal Astronomical Society, 1851)

The observatory remained active until the death of Edward Henry Cooper MP in 1902.

According to some sources Cecil Frances Alexander wrote her famous hymn All Things Bright and Beautiful while a guest there in 1848. The castle, as we see it today, dates from 1802 with exterior changes by the architect Francis Johnston and with some changes made, mainly to the interior, in 1896.

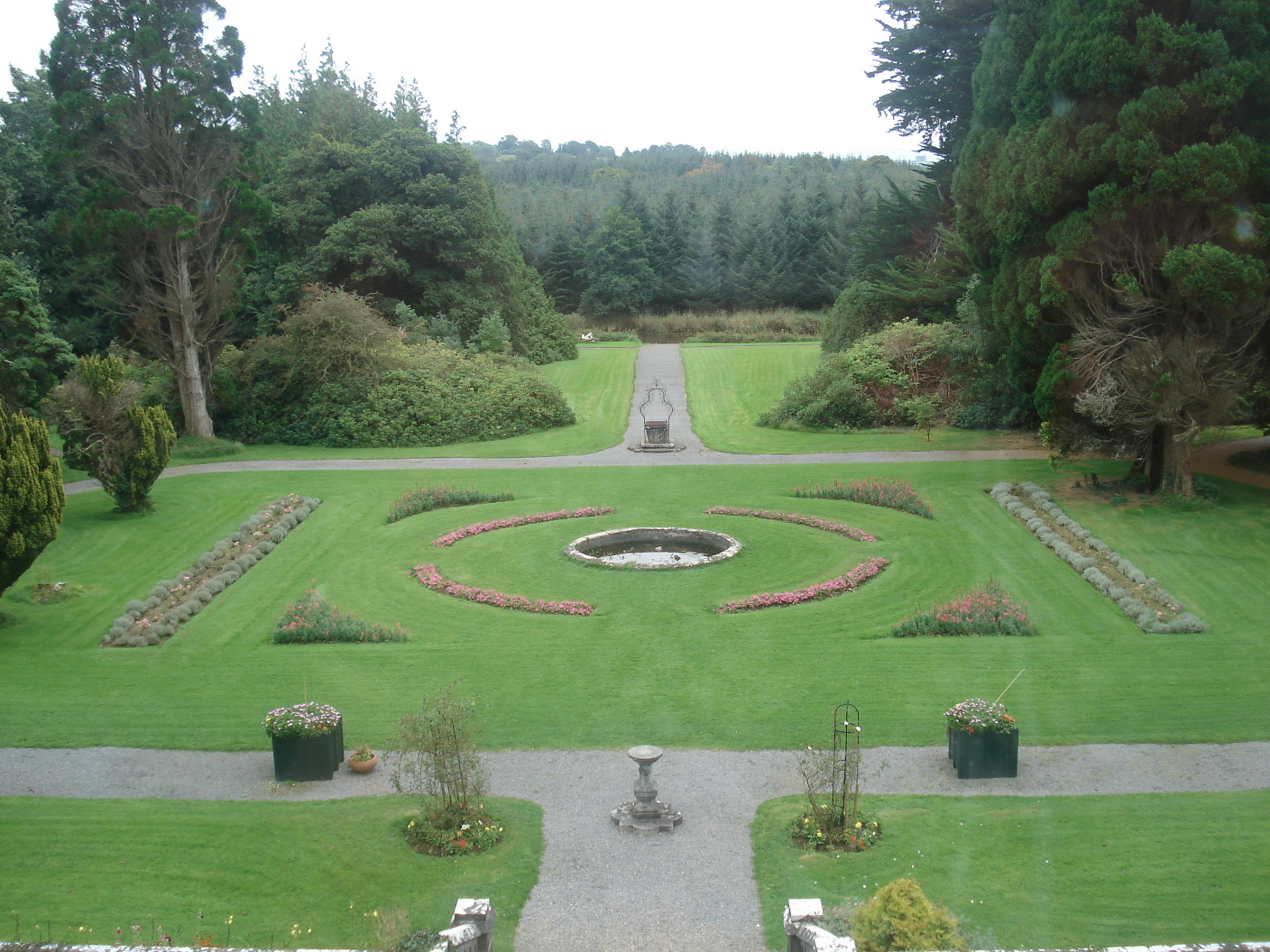
The garden

=== Weather record ===
Ireland's lowest officially recognised air temperature, −19.1 °C (−2.4 °F), was measured at Markree Castle on 16 January 1881.

=== 20th century ===
The soldier and politician Bryan Cooper inherited the castle on the death of his father in 1902 and resided there with his family (except during World War I and when carrying out political duties) from 1903 until his death in 1930.

Following the Second World War, the castle was lived in by Bryan and Elizabeth Cooper until he died in 1981. His son, Edward Cooper, took on the estate in 1981 but chose to convert the stable yard into a more manageable home and focused on farming. The castle was empty between 1982 and 1992 with the exception of a 1988 television miniseries called Troubles. Charles Cooper, the younger son, opened the castle as a hotel in 1992. It was sold to the Corscadden family in 2015, who did extensive renovations.

The castle's restoration was featured in a television documentary, and the renewed facilities featured a hotel and restaurant.

== The castle today ==
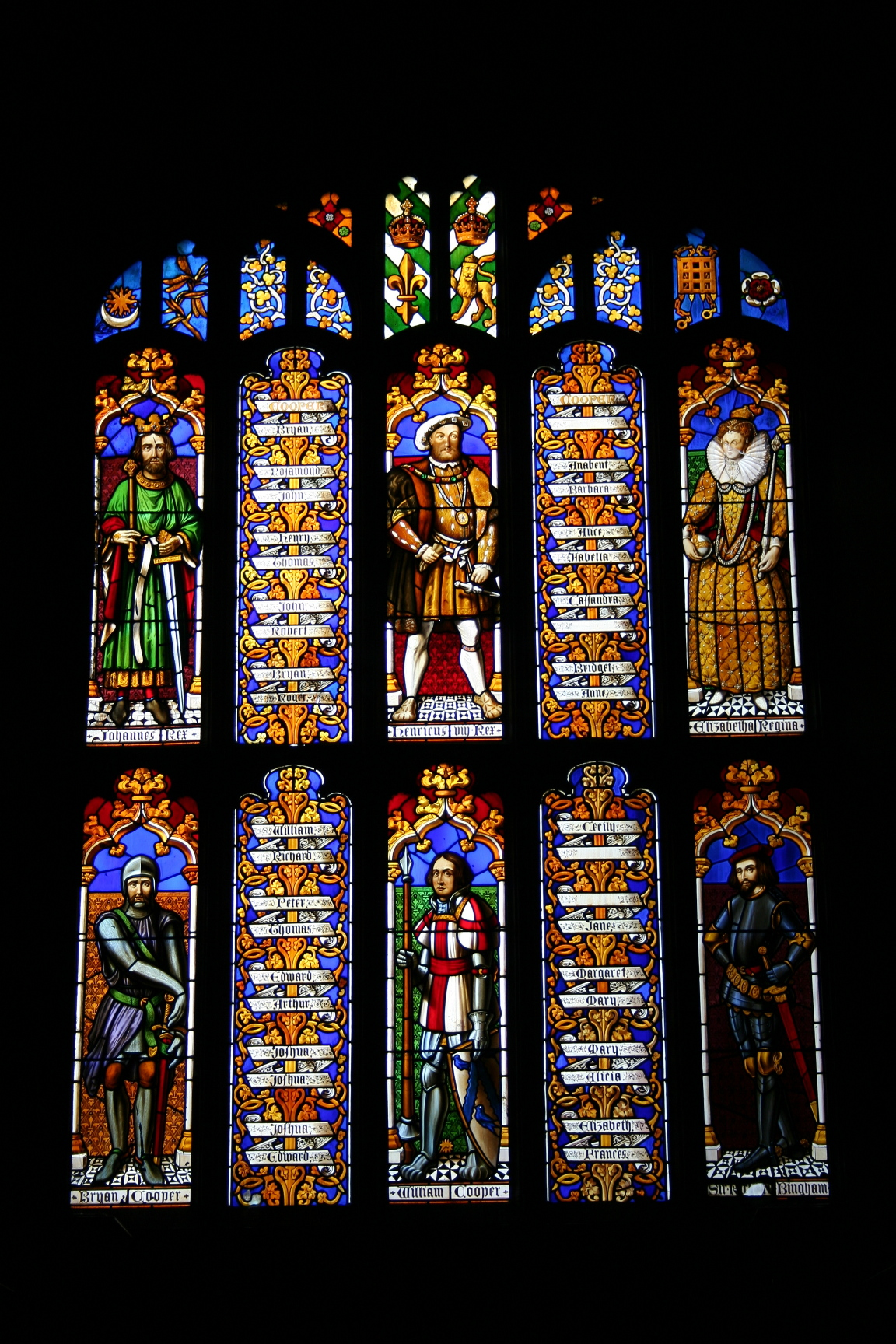
The Cooper family tree

In recent times, Markree Castle has operated as a hotel, run by Charles and Mary Cooper, the 10th generation of the family to live there. In 2015, after four centuries, it finally changed hands and is now run by the Corscadden family who also own Cabra Castle Hotel in County Cavan, Ballyseede Castle Hotel in County Kerry and Bellingham Castle in County Louth.

The 300-acre (1.2 km^{2}) estate holds an array of wild life including red squirrels, otters, and kingfishers.

The entrance contains a monumental staircase, which leads to a wonderful hall, from where a second staircase in carved wood leads to the 30 guest rooms. On the landing, a huge stained glass window traces the Cooper family tree from Victorian times back to the time of King John. The dining room is decorated in Louis Philippe-style plasterwork.

== See also ==
- Markree Observatory
