= Aldershot Observatory =

Refracting telescope in Aldershot, England

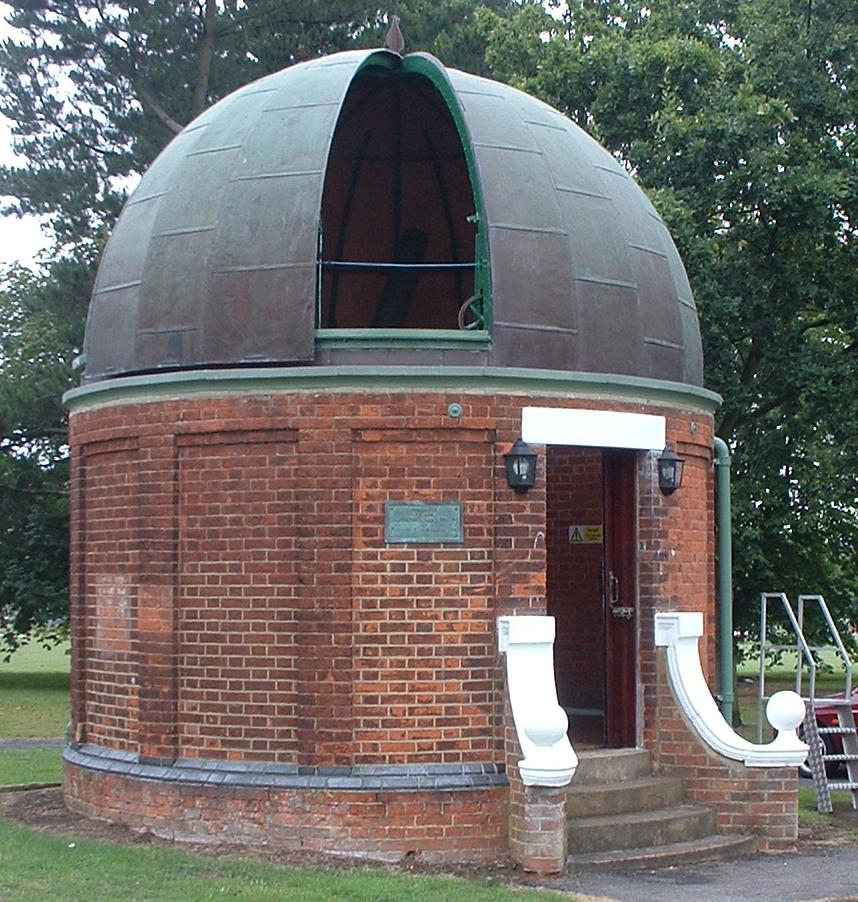
- Alternative names: The Alexander Observatory
- Location(s): Aldershot, Rushmoor, Hampshire, South East England, England
- Coordinates: 51°15′30″N 0°45′44″W
- Diameter: 8 in (0.20 m)
- Location of Aldershot Observatory
- Related media on Commons

Aldershot observatory is a circular red-brick building with a domed roof standing on Queens Avenue in Aldershot Military Town near Aldershot, England, home to the British Army since circa 1854. Inside is an 8-inch (203 mm) refracting telescope on a German-type equatorial mount with a clockwork drive which will run for about 2 hours without rewinding, this has a facility to vary the drive rate. The telescope and observatory building were a gift from aviation pioneer Patrick Young Alexander to the British Army, a fact which is recorded by a plaque near the observatory door. It reads: ‘Presented to the Aldershot Army Corps by Patrick Y Alexander Esq 1906’.

== History ==
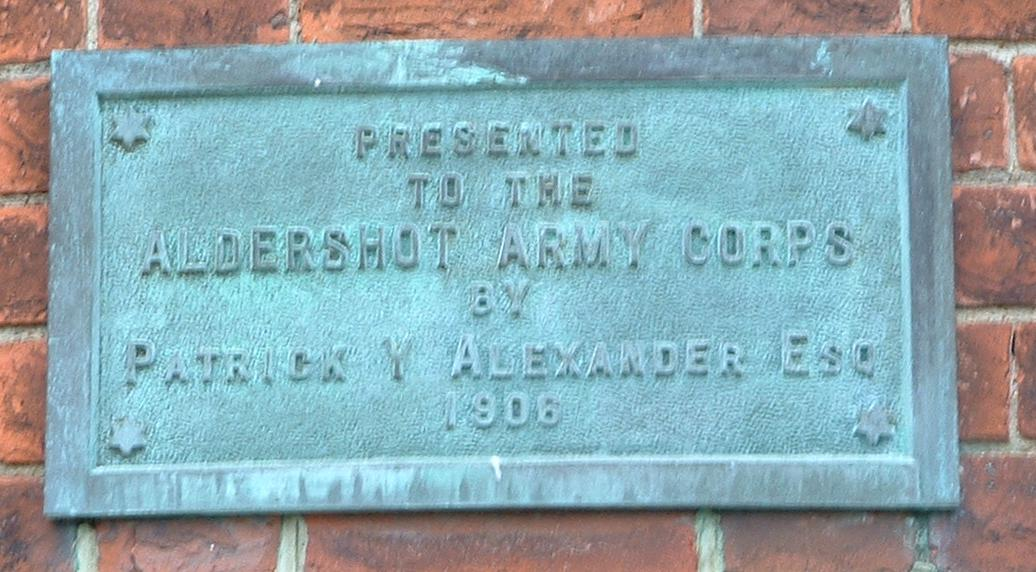
Dedication plaque.

In 1891, Patrick Alexander ordered the telescope from the well-known Victorian telescope makers Thomas and Howard Grubb of Dublin with all the usual fittings associated with a professional instrument of the time. It is not entirely clear where the telescope was first installed, accounts vary. It is probable that the telescope was first erected at one of Patrick Alexander's several private workshops in Bath: either 'DeMontalat Wood' or 'The Mount'. The telescope was a substantial instrument, which together with its mounting, must have weighed several tons. The telescope was fully equipped for astronomical observations and Patrick became a fellow member of the Royal Astronomical Society up until 1921. Although he enjoyed showing his telescope to friends and distinguished visitors, any interest he had in astronomy was overshadowed by his other aviation related passions — especially ballooning; the telescope was probably a scientific toy. Barry Bellinger suggests that the telescope was used to track pilot balloons released into the air, before releasing any main balloons; however, a telescope of this size and type seems ill-suited to such a task.

In 1902 Patrick Alexander offered the telescope to the city of Bath, with all expenses paid to build an observatory, but Bath refused because the cost of upkeep would have to be paid by local taxpayers. The telescope was later dismantled and stored, until a new location was found for it to be sited. In 1904 Alexander moved to 112 Mychett Road Mychett, Surrey. He installed the telescope in his back garden.

In 1905 Patrick Alexander offered his telescope to the War Office, again including an offer to pay for the construction of an observatory. The offer was accepted and a site was chosen. Building work commenced with pegging out in 1906 with the bulk of the work being carried out by local labour. Work proceeded apace until a long, accurate straight edge was required so that the dome could be correctly positioned. Finding such an edge proved difficult and attracted some publicity at the time. The problem was soon overcome. On 26 August 1906 the dome, which also had been designed by Grubb, was installed and over the next three months, the telescope was put in place and final construction work was completed.

In December 1906 the Aldershot Observatory was officially opened. The ceremony was attended by Patrick Alexander, guests from Aldershot civic council and several high-ranking army officers. Local Aldershot News reports of the opening ceremony on 22 December 1906 show that no civic guests were invited.

== Design and construction ==
The building is of conventional design. It is principally of redbrick with some white stone masonry, surmounted by a cupola. There are three steps leading up to a heavy ornamental door. The dome was originally covered in a rubberoid material (modified bitumen) but in time this perished and the dome was rebuilt with copper cladding. The building today is generally in good condition.

In the best traditions of Victorian engineering, the dome rotation is controlled by a pulley and rope loop, as is the dome opening mechanism. The dome opening is triangular in shape, a design which limits the usefulness of the telescope because the area of sky visible reduces sharply as the telescope is pointed to the zenith.

Early photographs show the telescope to have been light green in colour. It is now painted a dark British army green. Major maintenance took place in 1987; this resulted in the copper dome and the instrument being repainted drab green. The original colour was a light blue/green used by the military on all instruments of the time (1940s). In November 2006 the electricity supply was disconnected as a savings measure.

== Location ==
The location of the observatory can hardly be considered ideal for astronomical observations, even at the time of its construction. It is at a low elevation in an essentially urban setting of an army town with many nearby buildings that date from the time of its construction. It is very near a road that is lit by streetlights, although this was somewhat ameliorated by a clockwork switch inside the observatory that would turn off the nearest streetlights for about 20 minutes. This clockwork system was upgraded in 1987. As the electricity supply has been removed in 2006, this facility is no longer available.

== Use ==
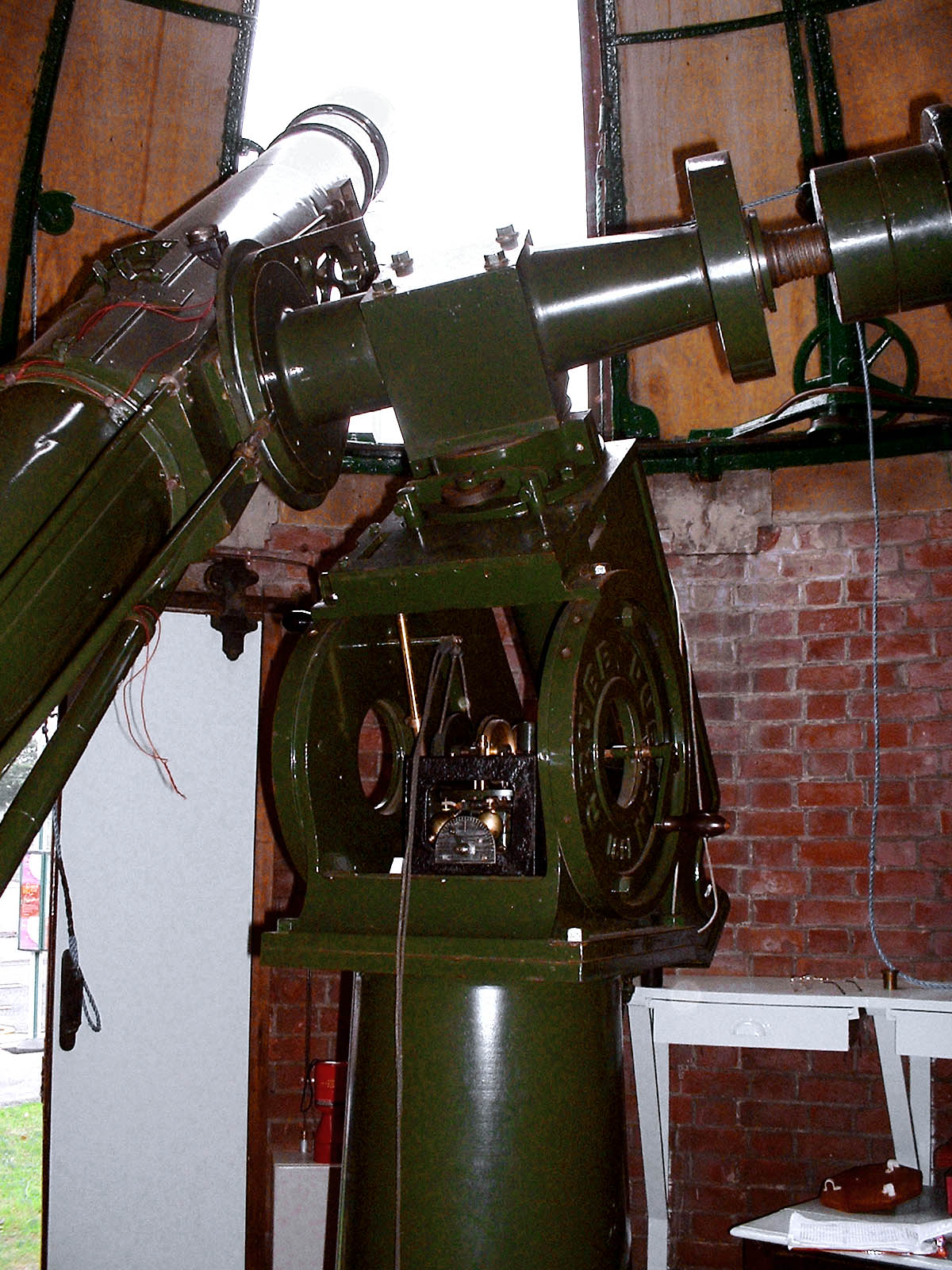
Telescope in the Aldershot observatory.

Just what use the British Army made of their new telescope is a bit of a mystery. It was, apparently, used in the training of officers in astronavigation. The telescope may also have been employed in monitoring experimental flights from HM Balloon Factory established at nearby Farnborough in 1908 (later to become the Royal Aircraft Establishment).

Over the last 100 years, many local amateur and professional astronomers have made use of the telescope.

Before the second World War, observations of variable and double stars were carried out, often by local members of the British Astronomical Association. Most of the users particularly remember the telescope's fine performance on lunar and planetary detail. In early August 1933, local amateur astronomer Mr John Pettley observed the famous Great White Spot on Saturn on the same night that it was discovered by Will Hay and later observations of the white spot by Pettley appeared in several issues of the "English Mechanic" during September 1933.

Since the end of the Second World War, use of the observatory has continued on an ad hoc basis. The army permitted the telescope to be used by interested amateurs provided only that they could demonstrate competence with the instrument; they were allowed to draw a key from a nearby guardroom and use the telescope as they wished. A story now often repeated, is the recollection of a user who remembers that military regulations imposed at one time gave some difficulty: the key would be issued only between the hours of 9am and 5pm — the observatory had to be securely locked by 5:30 and the key returned!

In 1979 the observatory was closed because of corrosion of the dome and defects in the dome traverse gear. Trees were allowed to grow up around the building and the observatory was neglected. At some point the observatory was broken into by thieves who stole the sighting telescope, a modern replacement has since been installed.

In 1998 the observatory was rediscovered by a local amateur astronomer. Work started on cleaning the interior which was by then covered in dust, dirt and leaves. The telescope itself was in working condition, in 1999 the Army gave permission for the removal of the lens cell for refurbishment. By April 2000, the lens cell was replaced and the telescope fully restored and the larger of the surrounding trees had been removed. On 6 May 2000, the Aldershot Observatory was opened to the public for the first time ever, the event stimulating considerable local public interest in its future.

== The future ==
The future of the observatory is in some doubt. There are hopes that nearby streetlights might be lowered and shielded to reduce interference with observations, but in truth the instrument is little used and interest in the observatory is mainly historical.

The number of soldiers based at Aldershot is being greatly reduced. The Army is expected to withdraw entirely from the area that currently surrounds the observatory and the land will be redeveloped with private housing. In its current location, the observatory will be an island in a sea of houses and some people fear that it will be targeted by vandals or, perhaps, will have to be protected with high, unsightly fences.

Aldershot Observatory is a Grade II Listed building. This significantly restricts what can be done with the building. One possibility is to move the entire building a mile or so to the North where it can placed within the confines of Aldershot Military Museum.
