= Anne Walker (astronomer) =

British astronomer

- Born: 21 October 1863; Wickham Market, Suffolk, England
- Died: 2 March 1940 (aged 76); Glen Huntly, Victoria, Australia
- Occupations: Astronomer; Computer
- Employer: Cambridge Observatory

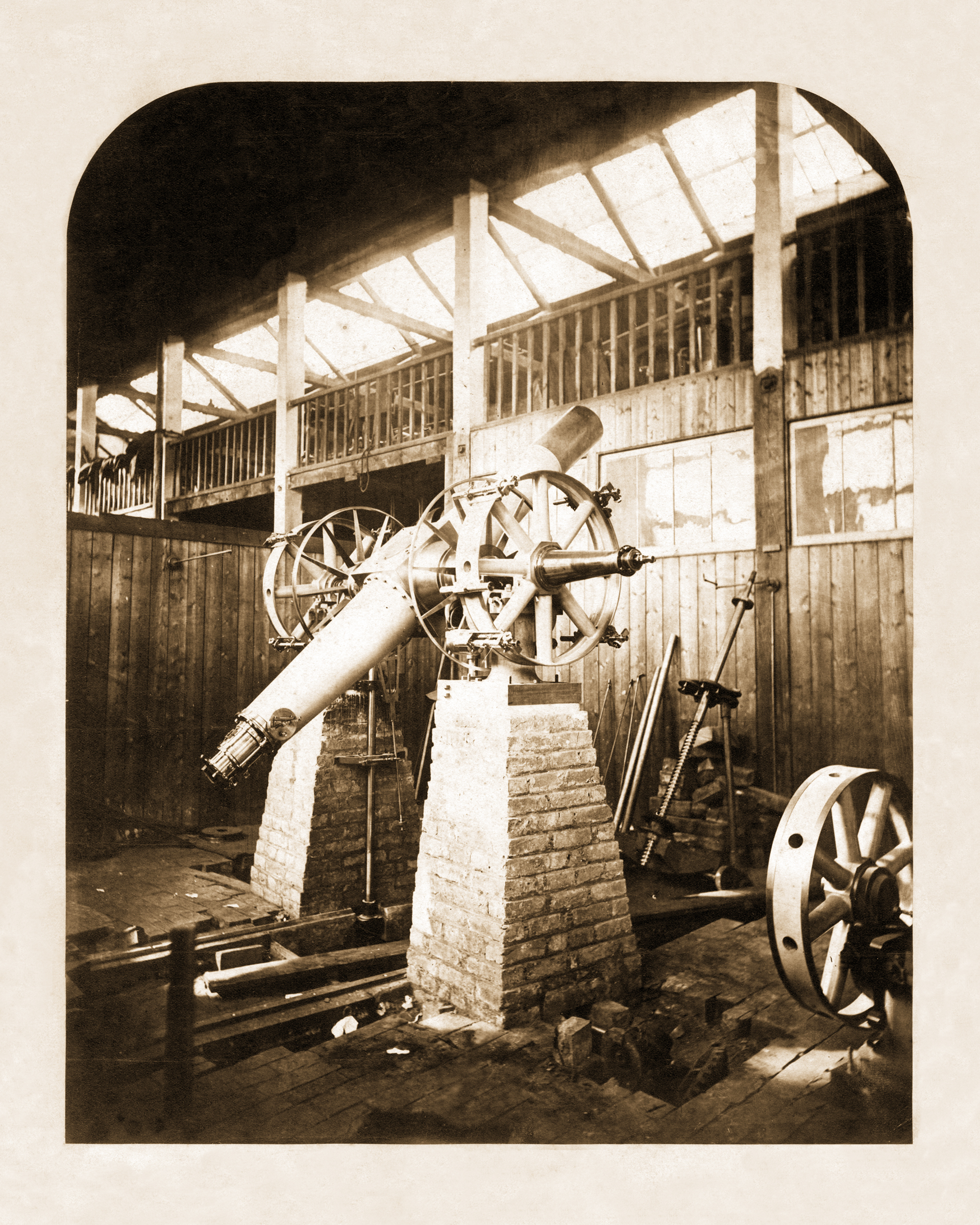
Photograph of Cambridge Observatory Transit Circle, presumably in Thomas Cooke and Son workshop, York, 1870. This is the instrument used by Walker for her documented observations.

Anne (also, Annie) Walker (21 October 1863 – 2 March 1940) was a British astronomer and one of the first—probably the first—women employed in paid routine work in astronomy in her country. She was one of a number of women computers employed at Cambridge Observatory between 1882 and 1903. Unlike most of these women, Walker remained at the observatory for a significant period of time.

== Early life and employment ==
Walker was born at Wickham Market, Suffolk on 21 October 1863, the daughter of a mill owner. After attending boarding school in Cambridge, she was employed by the observatory in 1882 at the age of 19, and remained there for 21 years, working under astronomers John Couch Adams and Robert Stawell Ball. She worked most directly with the observatory's senior assistant at the time, Andrew Graham. The observatory necessitated that only two observers worked at any one time. Up until 1892, Walker substituted for Graham's assistant Henry Todd when Todd's ill health prevented him from observing. That Walker was making transit observations with the meridian circle in the mid-1880s is clear from an observatory report that stated her work was interrupted by an earth tremor on 22 April 1884, when she had to stop while wires in the eyepiece vibrated. From 1892, Walker became Graham's observation partner and from 1894 to 1896, she observed alone.

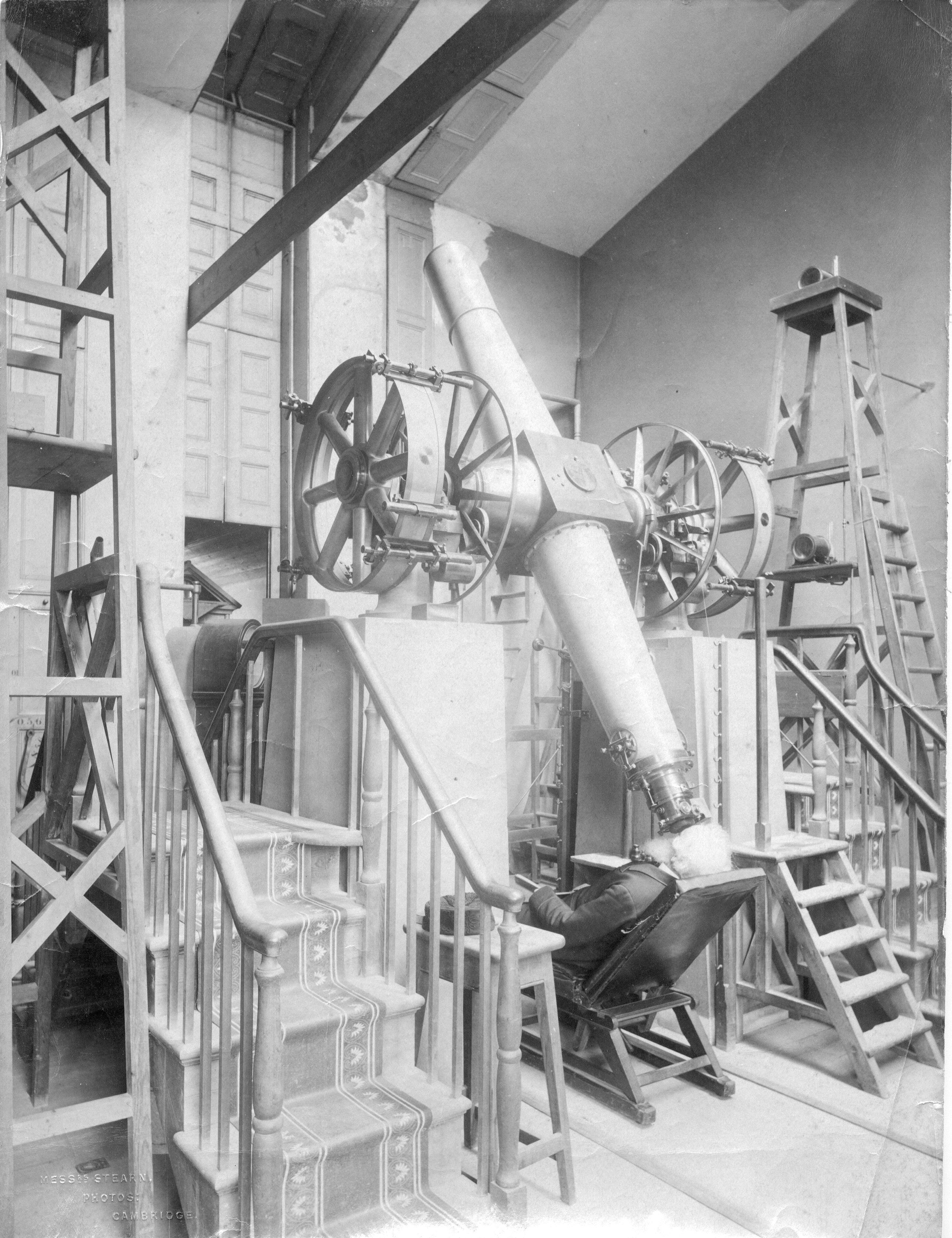
Photograph of the Cambridge Observatory Transit Circle, taken in April 1896. The astronomer is almost certainly Andrew Graham, Senior Assistant, with whom Walker worked most directly during her career

== Resignation ==
Andrew Graham retired in 1903 at the age of eighty-eight. Walker, who had hoped to be appointed to his position, was overlooked in favour of a younger, male, colleague whom she had trained. She therefore resigned at the same time as him, bringing her astronomical career at the Cambridge Observatory to an end after 21 years. She emigrated to join her brother Frank Walker, a butcher, in Nyora, near Melbourne, Australia and died on 2 March 1940 in Glen Huntly, Victoria.

== True nature of role and legacy ==
It has been suggested that Walker was much more than a routine computer, and that she took part in observations with Graham, whose eyesight was known to be failing. If true, this makes her the second woman (after Caroline Herschel) to have been recorded formally engaging in night-time astronomical observations.

Two catalogues of Walker’s star observations were published in the 1920s, but it is not known that she was made aware of this.

In 2025 an asteroid was named after Walker; it is called Anniewalker. The same year, the Institute of Astronomy at the University of Cambridge launched a search for a photograph of Walker, in order to be able to better commemorate her contributions.
