= Comet seeker =

19th century telescope

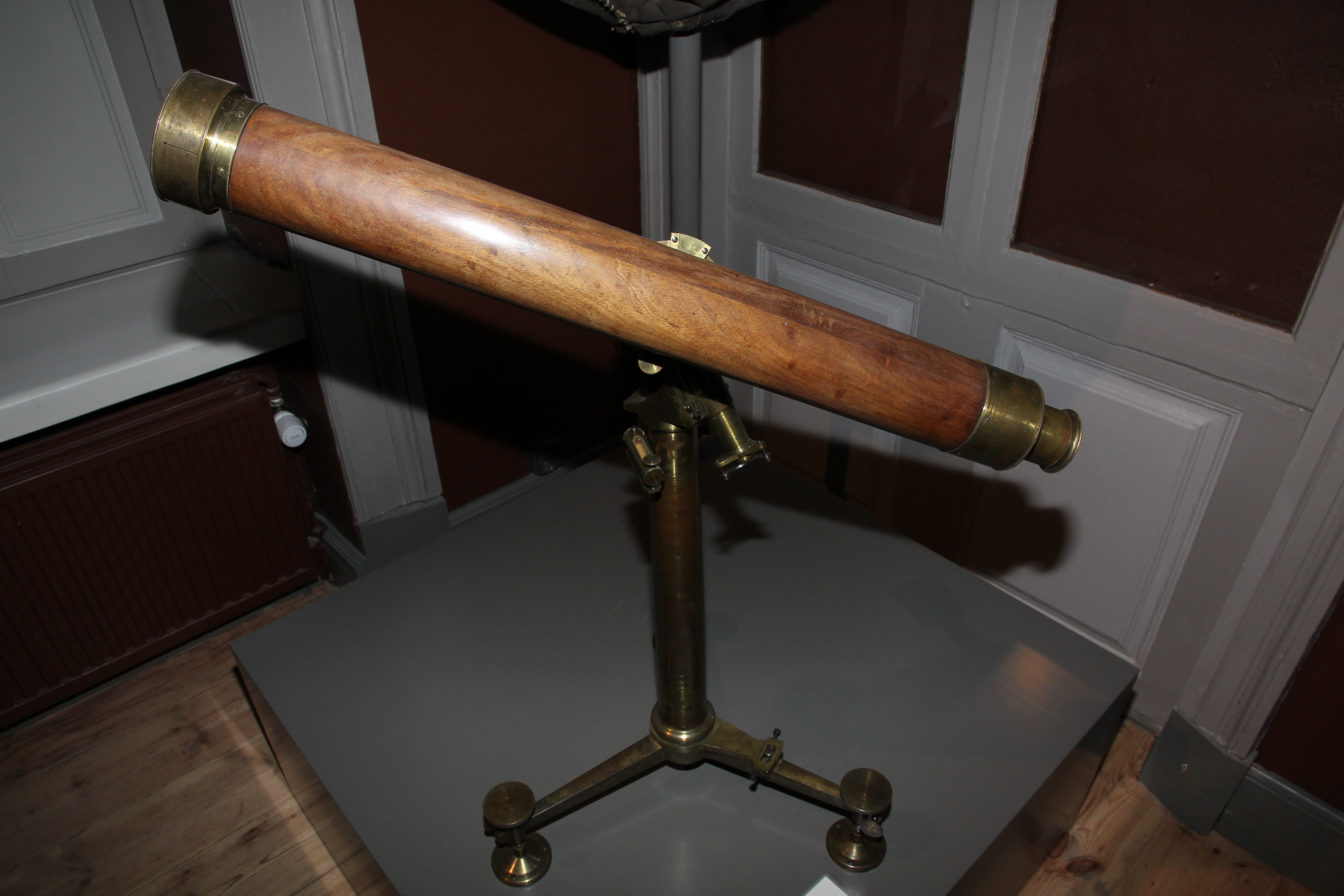
Comet seeker telescope, Helsinki observatory. Made by Utzschneider and Fraunhofer in 1830s.

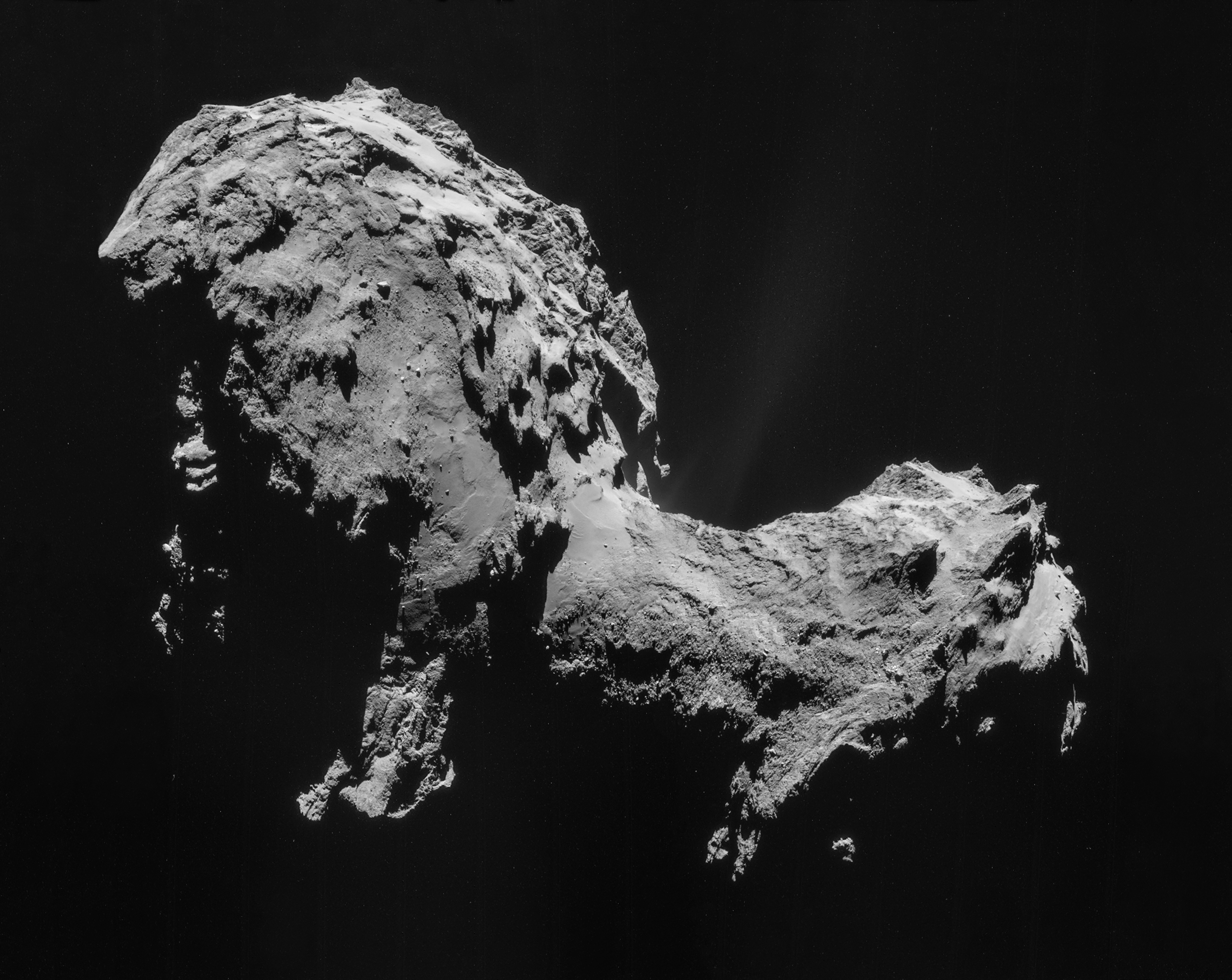
A comet closeup, visited by a probe in the early 21st century

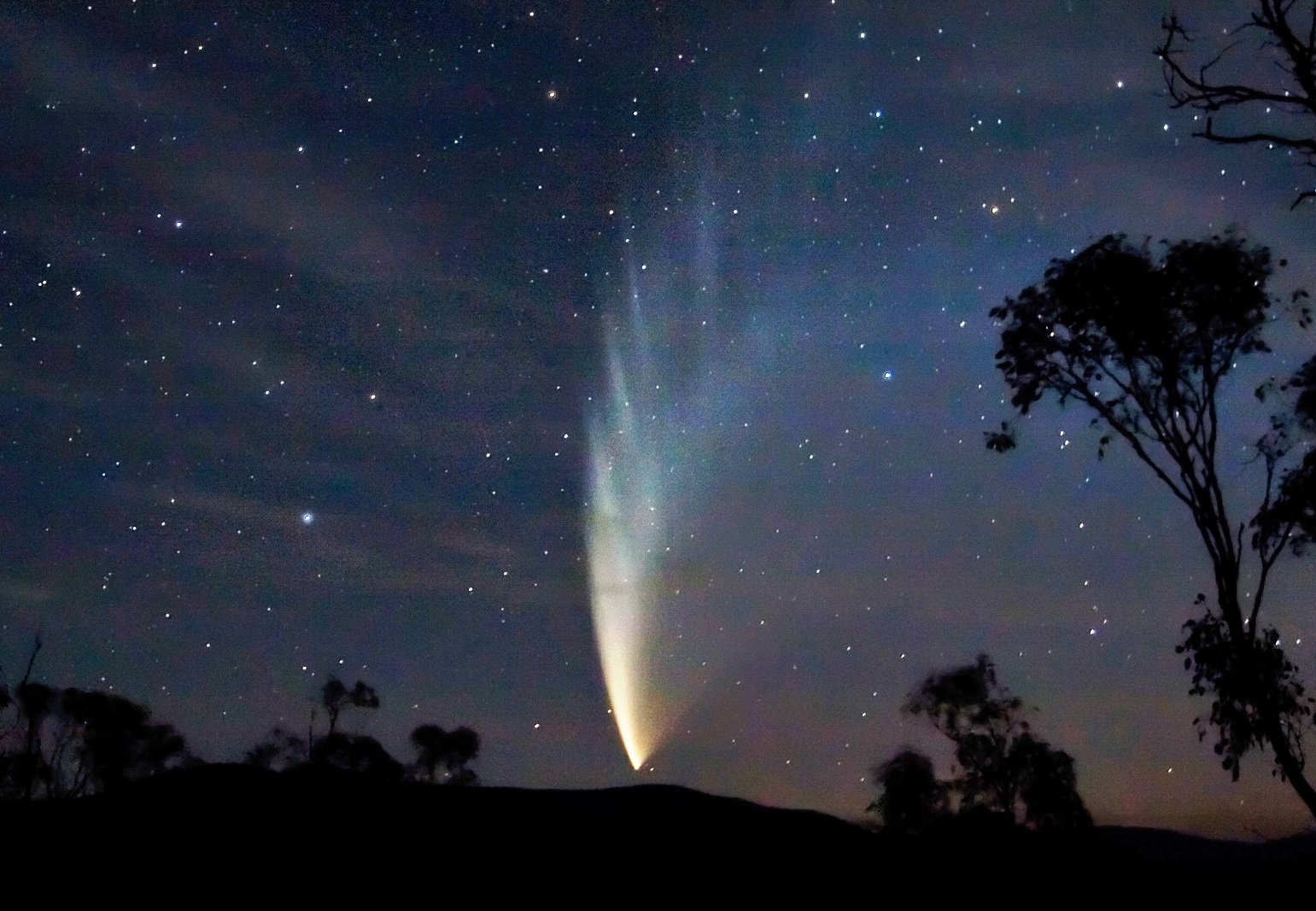
A comet as seen from Earth

A comet seeker is a type of small telescope adapted especially to searching for comets: commonly of short focal length and large aperture, in order to secure the greatest brilliancy of light. This style of telescope was used to discover the asteroid 9 Metis in 1848.

== Design ==
A comet seeker telescope is a type of optical device that is known for having a short focal length but a wide field of view.

== Examples ==
A comet seeker with about 3.9 inch aperture was installed at the United States Naval Observatory in 1843, and later transferred to the Smithsonian Museum in 1866. It had an aperture of 4 inches (10.2 cm) and was made by Utzschneider & Fraunhofer in Munich. This was operated as part of a suite of several other instruments including a larger refractor on an equatorial mounting, a meridian transit, mural circle, etc.

Markree Observatory added a 3-inch aperture Comet Seeker on an equatorial mount by Ertel. It was ordered in 1842, and in place until 1874.

The Markree Comet Seeker was used to discover 9 Metis in April 1848. It was discovered by Edward Cooper's assistant Andrew Graham, who worked at that observatory until 1860. Graham also observed and sketched the Orion nebula with this Ertel Comet seeker.

An 8.6-centimetre (3.4 in) aperture Comet Seeker was used, with some customizations, to produce the Bonner Durchmusterung star catalog from Bonn Observatory, in the 19th century.

In 1866 a Comet Seeker telescope of 18 centimetres (7.1 in) aperture by Martin was acquired by the Marseille Observatory in France.

== See also ==
- List of telescope types
- List of largest optical telescopes in the 19th century
- Lists of comets
