= Thomas Grubb =

Irish engineer and telescope builder

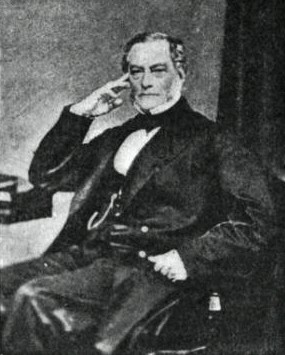
- Born: 4 August 1800; Portlaw, County Waterford
- Died: 16 September 1878 (aged 78); Monkstown, Dublin
- Resting place: Mount Jerome Cemetery
- Spouse: Sarah Palmer
- Children: Howard Grubb
- Parent(s): William Grubb and Eleanor Fayle
- Engineering career
- Practice name: Grubb Parsons
- Employer: Bank of Ireland (1840-?)
- Significant design: Telescope

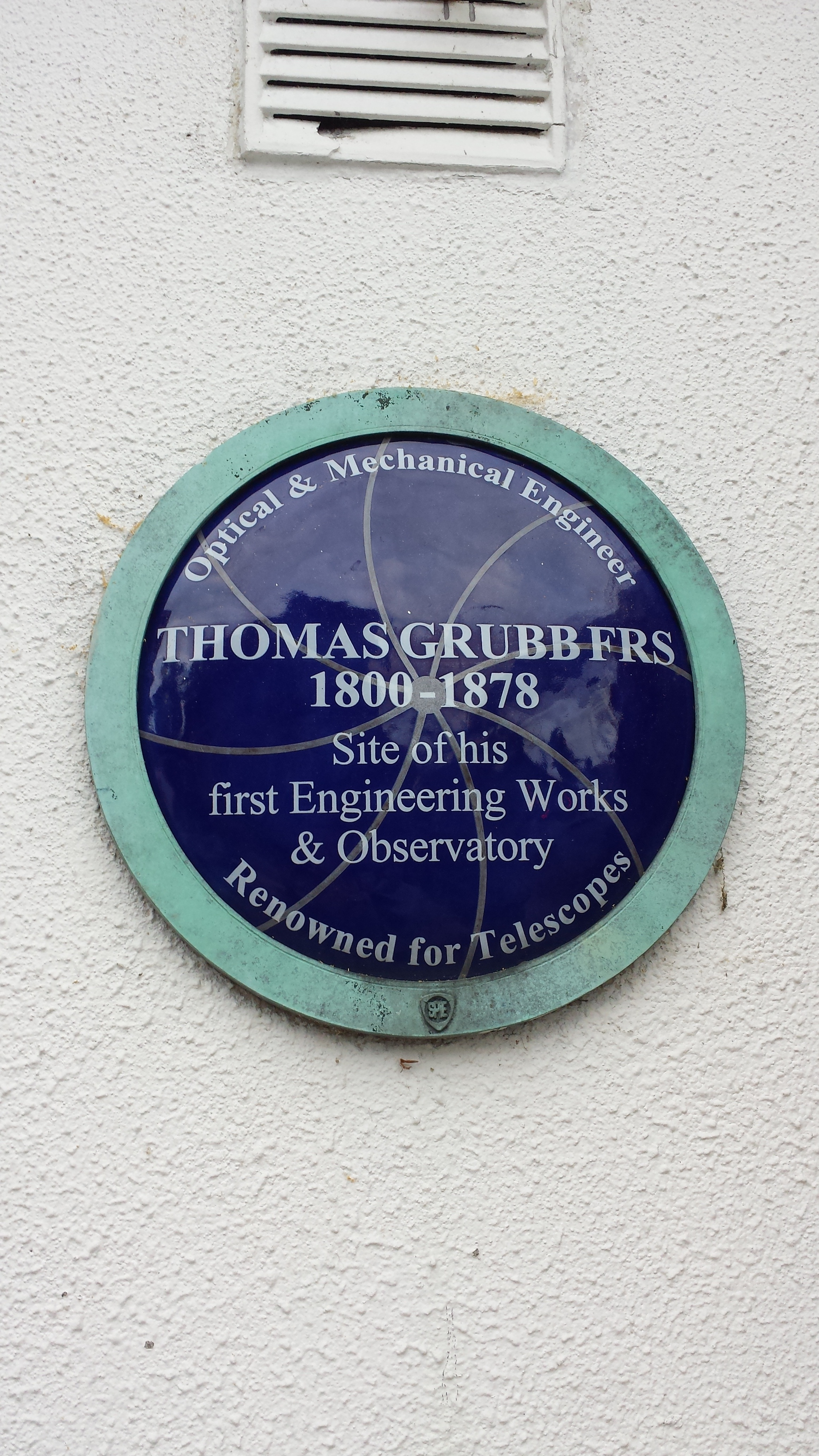
Site of his first Engineering Works & Observatory

Thomas Grubb (4 August 1800 – 16 September 1878) was an Irish optician, astronomer, engineer, early photographer, and founder of the Grubb Telescope Company.

== Early life ==
He was born near Portlaw, County Waterford, Ireland, the son of William Grubb Junior, a prosperous Quaker farmer and his second wife, Eleanor Fayle.

Thomas started out in 1830 in Dublin as a metal billiard-table manufacturer. He diversified into making telescopes and erected a public observatory near his factory at 1 Upper Charlemont Street, Portobello, Dublin. As makers of some of the largest and best-known telescopes of the Victorian era, the company was at the forefront of optical and mechanical engineering. His innovations for large telescopes included clock-driven polar mounts, whiffletree mirror mounting cells and Cassegrain reflector optics. Later, the manufacturing firm changed its name to Grubb-Parsons in 1925.

== Works ==
Thomas Grubb's reputation as a competent telescope maker began to spread as he offered his talents to the Irish astronomical community. Grubb first met the director of Armagh Observatory, Romney Robinson, sometime in the 1830s. His first commission was for E.J. Cooper of Markree Observatory. He was tasked to mount a 13.3 inch lens which was used to view the solar eclipse of 15 May 1836.

Grubb helped build the famous telescope for William Parsons, 3rd Earl of Rosse, at Parsonstown (now known as Birr), County Offaly, Ireland. One of his earliest instruments - the telescope for Markree Observatory in County Sligo in the West of Ireland, supplied in 1834 - was, until 1839, the largest refracting telescope in the world. It was used to sketch Halley's comet in 1835 and to view the solar eclipse of 15 May 1836. Grubb's work at the Markree Observatory would become known as a milestone in the creation and handling of large-scale telescopes.

In 1837, Thomas Grubb worked with fellow Irish scientist James MacCullagh. Together, they conducted a series of experiments on metallic refraction.

Later he built telescopes for observatories worldwide, including Aldershot Observatory, Melbourne, Vienna, Madrid and Mecca and others.

Thomas Grubb's company also made various scientific devices for Trinity College in Dublin. In 1839, his company made about twenty sets of magnetometers.

These magnetometers were requested by Professor Humphrey Lloyd who was very involved with Grubb's work. He sought Grubb's talents because so he could be close to the creation process and supervise his work.

Starting from 1840, Grubb also worked as an engineer for the Bank of Ireland. He was responsible for designing machines used in the creation of banknotes. These machines were used for engraving, printing and numbering the banknotes.

Grubb made a contract with the government of Ireland in 1866 to construct a telescope that would be sent to the southern hemisphere for use to compare the sky from there. This project would be known as the construction of the Melbourne Telescope. Grubb was tasked with mounting the telescope. He provided a large support to provide stability. The Royal Society Committee would go on to describe the telescope as 'a masterpiece of engineering'. This project would become renown amongst the global astronomers community and bolster Grubb's reputation. Unfortunately, the project would end in failure when the telescope was actually dismantled and shipped to Australia. Grubb was tasked of constructing a Cassegrain reflector that would include two 4-foot metal mirrors. The problem with the project was Grubb's choice of metal. This caused defects in the form of the astronomers in Melbourne being unable to re-polish the mirrors adequately.

The last major work of Thomas Grubb's would start with him and end with his son Howard Grubb. In 1875, he would go on to build the Great Vienna Telescope. This would be known as the largest refracting telescope in the world up to that point.

== Grubb Telescope Company ==
Thomas Grubb began his professional career in Dublin, Ireland in the year 1830 as a mechanical engineer. Here he created telescopes which became famous within the Irish astronomical community. His company was officially passed on to his son Thomas Grubb in 1916. What started as a general manufacturing firm was formally renamed Grubb-Parsons by Sir Charles Parsons in 1925. The firm was instrumental to the war efforts in World War I and changed its focus from telescope making to aiding the allies in their war efforts. This included the creation of gun-sights and submarine periscopes. The escalation of the war – particularly in 1916 – caused the firm to be under military guard. In 1918, the factory was moved to St. Albans, England in fear that Grubb-Parsons would be vulnerable in the weaker Ireland.

This shift of focus by the company from telescopes to the war effort marked a decrease in economic power that Irish astronomers held over the industry. A global shift to provide for the United States and the allies changed the scope of Grubb-Parsons forever. During the war, Grubb-Parsons built around 95% of the periscopes in British submarines.

== Later life ==
Thomas died in 1878 in Monkstown, Dublin, Ireland. He is buried at Mount Jerome Cemetery, Dublin, Ireland. Although the source of his death is unknown, he had been suffering from rheumatism since the start of the 1870s. He had married Sarah Palmer. Their youngest son was Sir Howard Grubb, who took over the optical business. Thomas Grubb's cousin, John Grubb Richardson (1813 - 1891) was a major Irish industrialist who founded the model village of Bessbrook.
