= Patrick Young Alexander =

Aviation pioneer

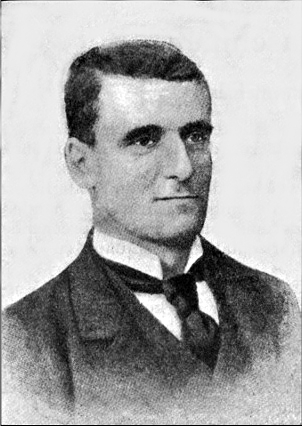
- Born: 28 March 1867; Belvedere, Erith, Kent, England
- Died: 7 July 1943 (aged 76)
- Occupations: aviator, meteorologist

Patrick Young Alexander (28 March 1867 – 7 July 1943) was a British aeronautical pioneer fascinated by the possibility of heavier-than-air flight. He was an enthusiastic balloonist and he was also active in meteorology. He performed many meteorological and aviation experiments, designing and building his own equipment. He travelled widely, visiting Australia in his youth and later making many visits to the United States, crossing the Atlantic at least 50 times. He travelled widely in Europe and visited Mexico, Russia, Siberia and Africa in pursuit of his interests.

Alexander was respected by fellow aeronautical pioneers and knew Octave Chanute, the Wright brothers, Alberto Santos-Dumont, Lawrence Hargrave, Louis Blériot, Henry Farman, Ferdinand von Zeppelin, Charles Rolls of Rolls-Royce and Major Baden Baden-Powell, as well as European heads of state and royalty. A world traveller, he arranged meetings between those interested in aeronautics, and gave lectures on the progress being made.

== Early years ==
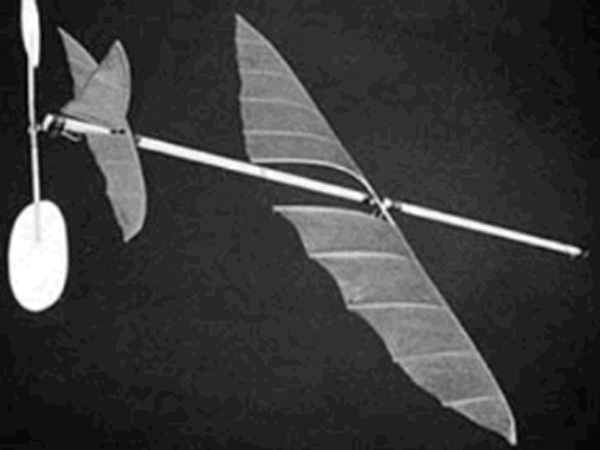
Planophore model airplane by Alphonse Pénaud, 1871

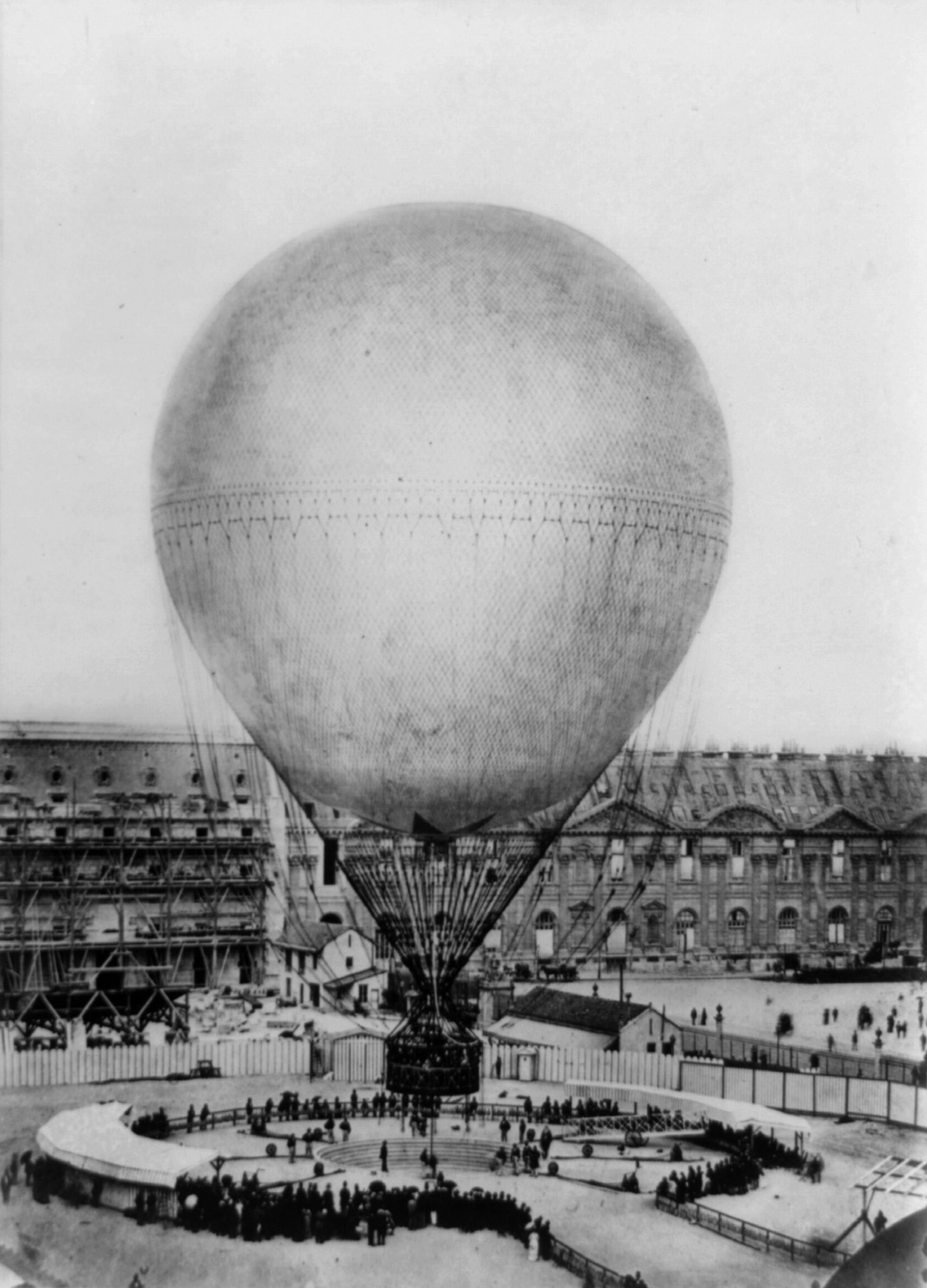
Henri Giffard balloon at the Tuileries, 1878

Alexander was born at Hern Villa, Belvedere, Erith, Kent. His mother was Harriotte Emma and his father was Andrew Alexander from Scotland. He had an elder brother, John Edmond who was three years older.

His father, Andrew Alexander, was a civil engineer of some standing and a mechanical engineer. He was interested in aeronautics and was a founder member of the Royal Aeronautical Society in 1866. He presented some papers to the society including "Power in Relation to Weight in Aerial Navigation". In 1875, he went to see Thomas Moy's Aerial Steamer at The Crystal Palace. This machine had many interesting design features and may have achieved a brief hop into the air; accounts vary. That year, Andrew Alexander became manager of the Cyclops works of Charles Cammell and Company in Sheffield, where he worked on the improvement of armour plate for warships.

In 1878, Alexander built an elastic driven model aeroplane of the Penaud type. In the late summer of that year, his father took him to see the Paris Exhibition. One attraction was irresistible: the enormous hydrogen balloon of Henri Giffard, which was capable of taking 52 passengers at a time on a tethered ascent to 500 metres (1,600 ft). The experience left a deep impression on Alexander, then 11 years old.

When Andrew Alexander left the Cyclops works, the family moved from Sheffield to Bath and Patrick decided on a career in the Merchant Navy.

== At sea ==
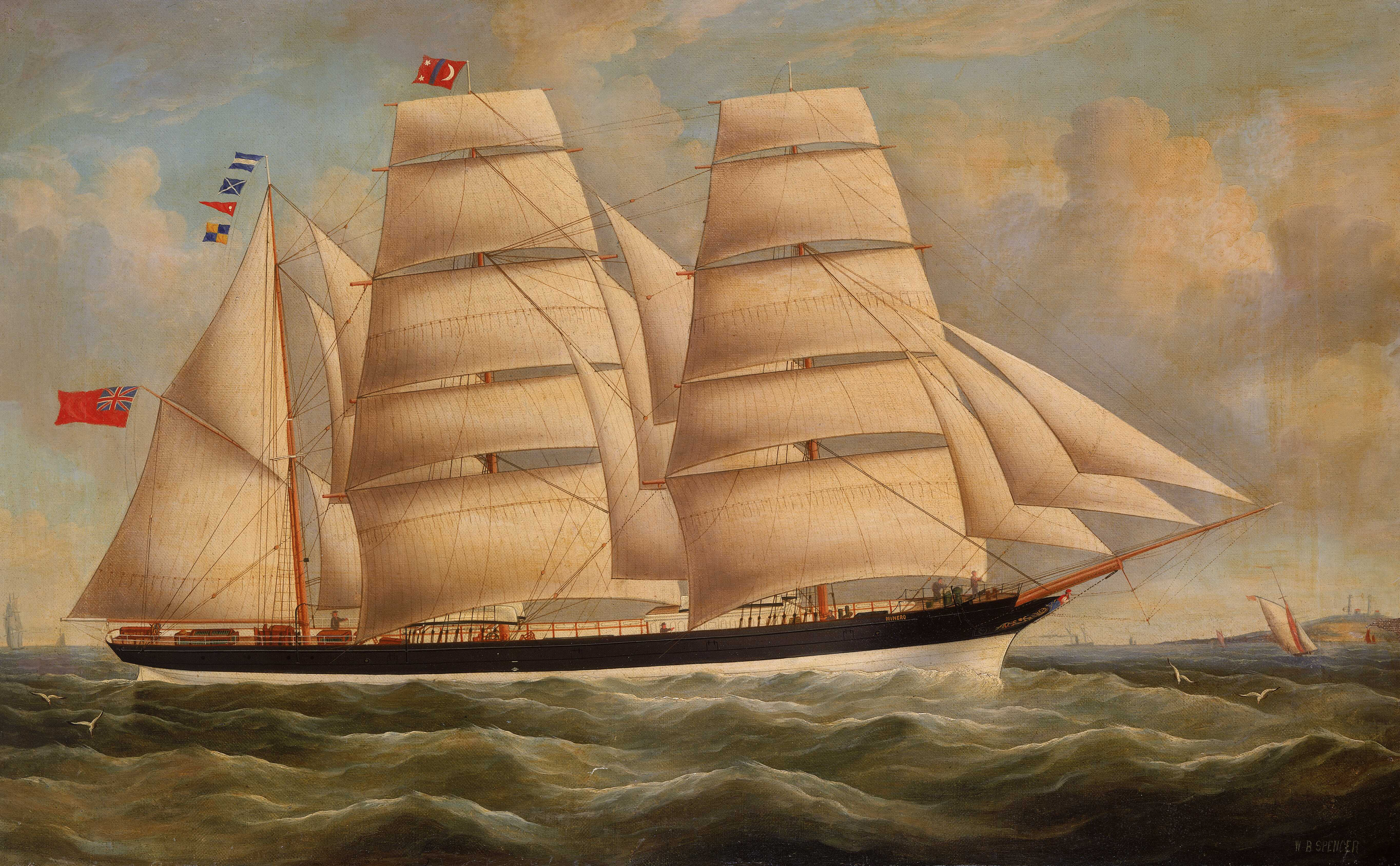
The barque Minero

On 1 April 1885, just three days after his 18th birthday, Alexander signed as an apprentice Merchant Navy officer. The very next day he sailed upon the Minero, a barque of 478 tones bound for Fremantle in Western Australia, a distance of 12,500 miles (20,000 km) in a vessel powered only by the wind.

60 days into the journey, while aloft helping with the sails, Alexander lost his grip and fell. As he hit the deck, he broke his leg. The ship was still three weeks away from port and there was little that could be done other than to strap Patrick into a bunk for the rest of the journey, letting the leg heal without expert attention.

The Minero had left England with a crew short by one member. At Fremantle, two of the crew jumped ship, possibly encouraged by rumours of gold being found in the desert; replacement crewmen were hard to come by and only one could be found. The Minero set sail for Cossack and Port Walcott some 1,000 miles (1,600 km) to the North, seeking a cargo, probably of wool and pearl shell, for the return to London. Patrick was getting about with the aid of a crutch and, given the shortage of crew, he was helping as best he could. On 10 August, in rough weather on a wet and slippery deck, Alexander fell again and re-broke his injured leg. He was taken to Victoria Hospital at Geraldton. The Minero returned to London without him. Patrick returned to England; despite treatment, his injuries would leave him disabled for life.

In 1886, while he was away from England, Alexander's brother died. The following year, Patrick's mother, Emma, died. In 1890, Patrick's father, Andrew, died at the age of 62. Patrick's father had left him almost £60,000 (equivalent to £6.67 million in 2025.)

== Taking off ==
Alexander became increasingly interested in aviation and related subjects, such as meteorology, parachutes, balloons, and propellers. By about 1888 he was working on wireless telegraphy. The French aviation historian Charles Dolfus recorded that Alexander was the first to suggest that wireless could be used for the automatic direction of airships and aeroplanes and said Patrick Alexander was a "Pioneer of Space".

On 9 June 1891, Patrick Alexander made a gas balloon ascent in the company of aeronaut Griffith Brewer: this was the first of a number of balloon ascents that would lead to his becoming a licensed balloonist. Alexander ordered a three-man (some say five-man) balloon from balloon manufacturer Percival G. Spencer, naming his balloon Queen of the West. Throughout the summer of 1892, Patrick and his friend Philip Braham made a number of flights. They collected meteorological observations and measurements and took photographs. Their adventures were recorded in a number of local newspapers.

Also in 1891, Patrick Alexander acquired an 8-inch (200 mm) aperture refractor telescope which was erected in Bath. The telescope was a substantial instrument, which together with its mounting, must have weighed several tons. The telescope was fully equipped for astronomical observations and Alexander was a member of the Royal Astronomical Society until 1921. Barry Bellinger suggests that the telescope was used to track pilot balloons released into the air, before releasing any main balloons; however, a telescope of this size and type seems unsuited to such a task.

In 1893, Patrick Alexander ordered a balloon of 100,000 cubic feet (2,800 m^{3}) capacity from Percival Spencer. At the time, C.G. Spencer and Sons' largest advertised balloon was of 80,000 cubic feet (2,300 m^{3}) and when it was made it attracted much public interest. Capable of lifting 12 passengers, it was one of the largest balloons yet made. Alexander named her the Majestic. In 1894, he took it to Germany where he conducted scientific ascents that excited interest among German scientists and the lay public, as well as that of Kaiser Wilhelm II.

Ever since the first balloon ascent by the Montgolfier Brothers in 1783, it had been realised that for balloons to be really useful, they had to be navigable. Patrick Alexander applied his mind to this problem of airship propulsion. In 1893 and 1894 he filed a number of patents. His ideas included reciprocating oars and an adjustable-pitch propeller that resembled a pair of fans. One patent includes a means of heating the gas in the balloon envelope by using piped steam, the steam pipe also served to support the balloon in the shape of a parachute in the event of the balloon being burst or punctured.

In Bath, Alexander set up the first of a series of workshops. His most prestigious workshop was The Mount at Batheaston purchased in 1900 and here he had a gas supply brought into the garden and a balloon inflation valve installed. Town gas, although not as light as Hydrogen, was readily available and very much less expensive; it was, of course, highly flammable. His workshops were fully equipped and employed several people, there he designed and manufactured experimental balloons and meteorological instruments.

Alexander joined the Aero clubs of Berlin, Paris and America and, at one time, that of Austria.

In 1900, the first Zeppelin made its maiden flight, observed by Alexander. The Zeppelin was launched from a floating assembly hall on Lake Constance; Alexander observed from a motor boat in order to be as close as possible. Later that year, at the invitation of the Berlin Metrological Institute, he made a flight in the world's largest balloon, a non-dirigible with a capacity of 9,000 cubic metres (320,000 cu ft). The objective was to make metrological measurements and break the existing endurance records. The balloon was equipped against every eventuality and stocked with rations for 20 days. The balloon took off on 27 September, just before 6 pm. The same evening, their trailing rope became stuck in trees and gusty winds caused the crew to lose control. In the dark it was decided to release the gas and land the balloon. The ambitious expedition ended just 20 kilometres (12 mi) from the start.

Patrick Alexander was interested in the development of heavier-than-air flying machines. Early in the 1890s, he travelled to Germany to meet Otto Lilienthal who was experimenting with gliders, and he continued to study ideas from a wide variety of sources. In 1896, Hiram Stevens Maxim came close to achieving flight when his huge steam-powered machine briefly lifted from the rails that also restrained it. Patrick was in contact with Octave Chanute and others experimenting with flight. In the US, sometime before 1903, Patrick visited Samuel Pierpont Langley whose successful models had attracted much attention.

At Christmas 1902 he visited the Wright brothers at Kitty Hawk. On hearing that Alexander was planning a return trip to the US in October 1903, the Wright brothers, said they would be happy to meet him. However, Patrick missed a crucial telegram and never received their message, missing the opportunity to witness the first flights of the Wright Flyer on 17 December 1903.

Aldershot in Hampshire was an insignificant village until, in 1854, it was selected as the home of the British Army. It was in Aldershot that the army established the Army Balloon section. In June 1904, the American born aviation pioneer Samuel Franklin Cody came to Aldershot to test his kites. There, in collaboration with the Army, he worked on balloons, kites and aeroplanes. That same year, Alexander moved to nearby Mytchett in Surrey where he was involved with the Army Balloon section. He shared a house with Cody who later went on to become the first man in England to fly an aeroplane.

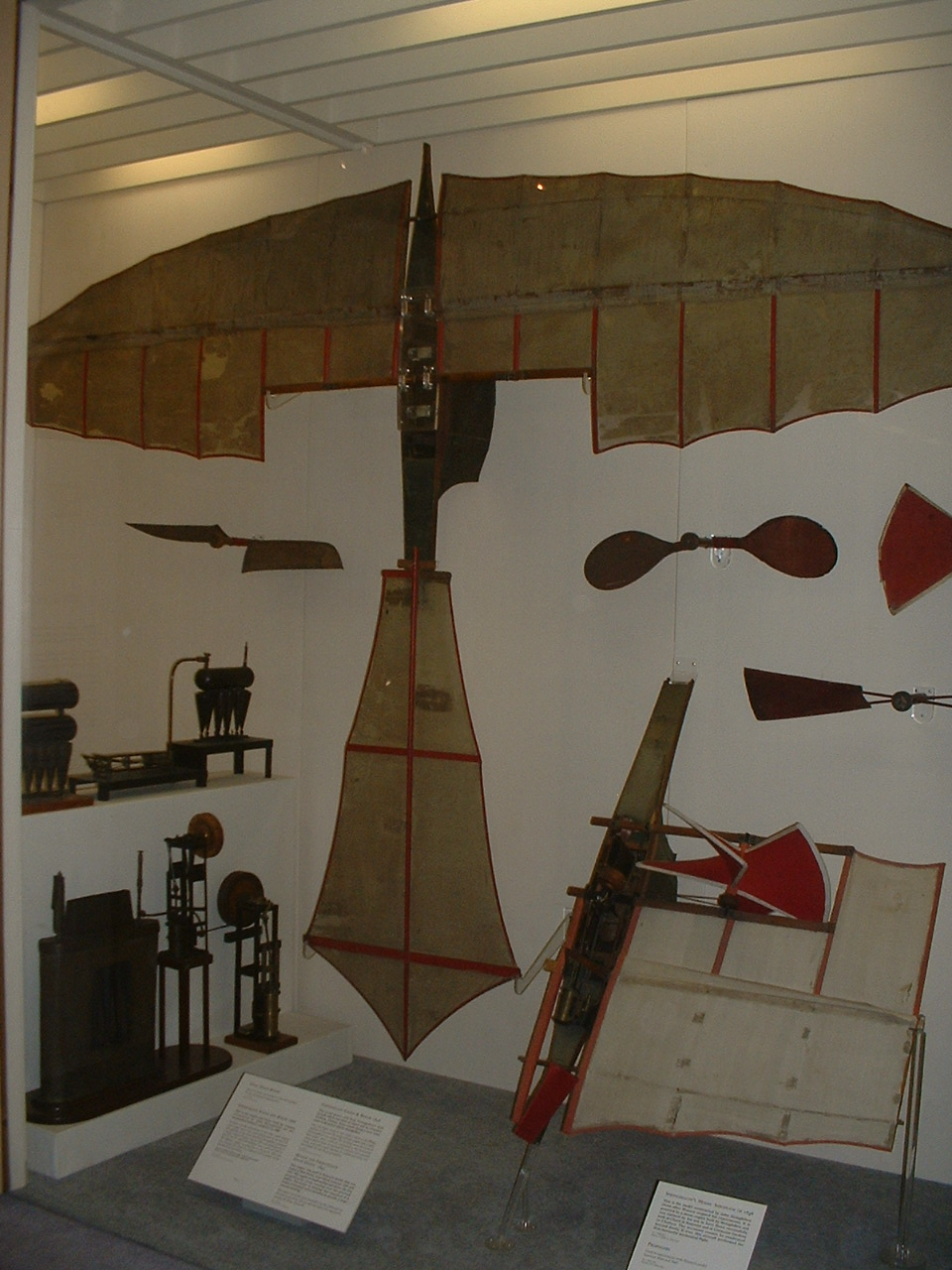
Stringfellow's flying machine in the Science Museum in January 2006

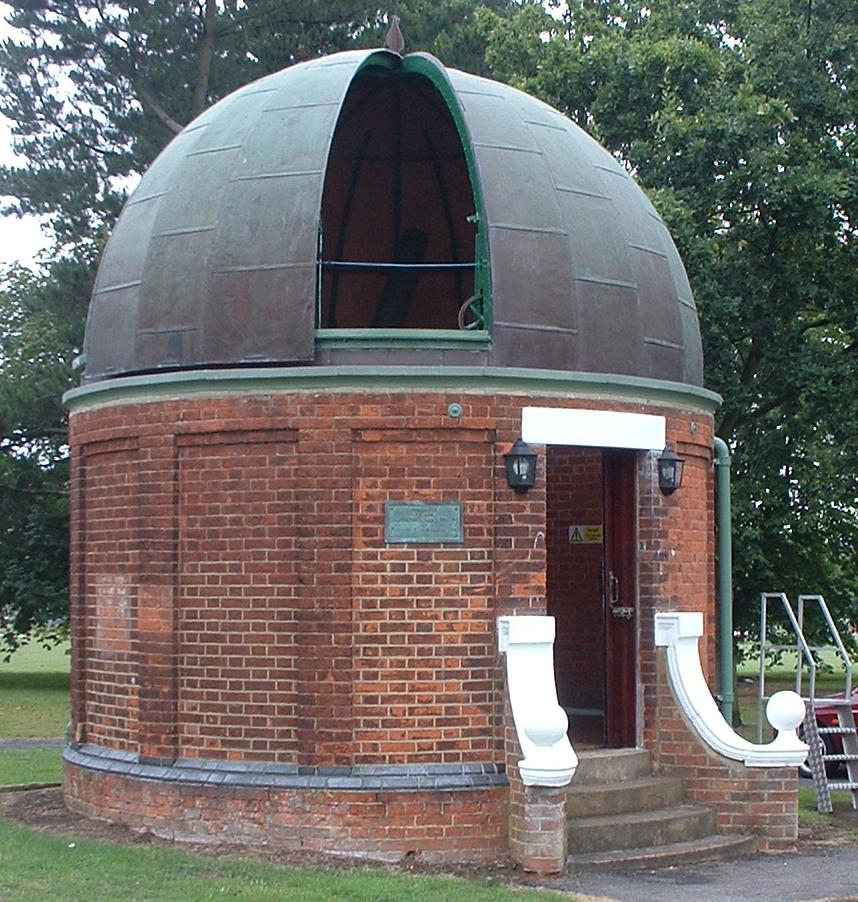
Aldershot Observatory

1905 was a year of public generosity. Chard in Somerset had been the location of some remarkable aviation experiments by John Stringfellow in 1848: he constructed a model aeroplane that is claimed to have achieved the first ever power flight. Some of the relics of these experiments were eventually bought for the Washington Museum. Alexander obtained and had restored at his expense, Stringfellow's earlier models and presented them to the Victoria and Albert Museum in London. Also, Patrick offered his telescope – the 8" refractor – to the War Office. The offer included the cost of construction of a suitable observatory to house it. The offer was accepted and a site was chosen. In December 1906, the Aldershot Observatory was officially opened, the opening ceremony was attended by several high-ranking officials and guests from Aldershot civic council, and Alexander himself.

In January 1910, Alexander issued the conditions of a £1,000 Alexander Award, a prize that he would offer for the development of a lightweight engine suitable for aviation. The prize was offered through the auspices of the Aerial League of which Alexander was a founding member and the testing would be performed by the National Physical Laboratory. (The prize, which was Alexander's own money, was a considerable sum; £1,000 in 1910 is equivalent to £102,000 in 2025.) Tests were carried out one year later. The Green Engine by Aster Engineering Ltd performed particularly well and, by unanimous agreement, won the prize.

== First World War ==
With the outbreak of World War I, Alexander came to America where he aided British propaganda by making statements in the American press. He was well known to New York journalists who reported his views at length and Alexander expressed his view on the importance of aviation in the conflict. In 1917, he was given a job by the newly formed Air Ministry at the Metrological Office at Falmouth; here he worked until the end of the war.

== Teaching ==
At the end of the First World War, Alexander was fifty years old and his inheritance was all but gone. Even his prodigious energies had been unable to keep up with the developments in aviation that had taken place during the conflict. He spent the rest of his life at the Imperial Service College, Windsor. There he taught students the basics of aeronautical principles.

== Legacy ==
Alexander died on 7 July 1943, almost penniless – having given most of his money away. His primary contribution to the history of aviation was that through his efforts, journeys, writings, public speeches, and donations he was responsible for collecting and disseminating ideas across nations and continents without which development in the field would have proceeded more slowly.

He was known to be a generous man with his time, his intellect and with his money. An inheritance and his business ability made him wealthy. He was driven by curiosity and ambition, and was supportive of the efforts of others, often making generous financial contributions, and was not jealous of their achievements.

Alexander was buried in a small churchyard in Windsor. Ironically his headstone faces the flight path from Heathrow Airport, and features a simple inscription:

Something Attempted Something Done
