= Markree Observatory =

Astronomical observatory

Coordinates: 54.174286°N 8.46147°W

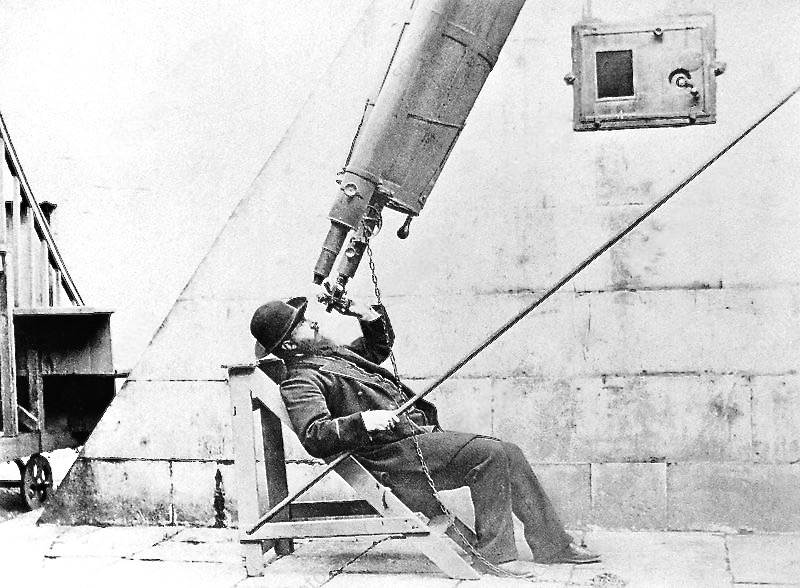
William Doberck using the refracting telescope at Markree Observatory

Markree Observatory was an astronomical observatory in County Sligo, Ireland. The asteroid 9 Metis was discovered from this observatory in 1848 by Cooper's assistant Andrew Graham using a comet seeker telescope. The observatory was also home to the largest refractor of the early 1830s, which had a 13.3-inch (340 mm) aperture Cauchoix of Paris lens; the largest in the world at that time. The observatory also housed a number of instruments and was operated to varying degrees throughout the 19th century.

The observatory is noted for its discovery of the asteroid 9 Metis in 1848 as well as a 60,000 item star catalogue of the 1850s. In the later 1800s it was operated again after a brief hiatus, and gained note for its meteorological observations and research on double stars.

== History ==
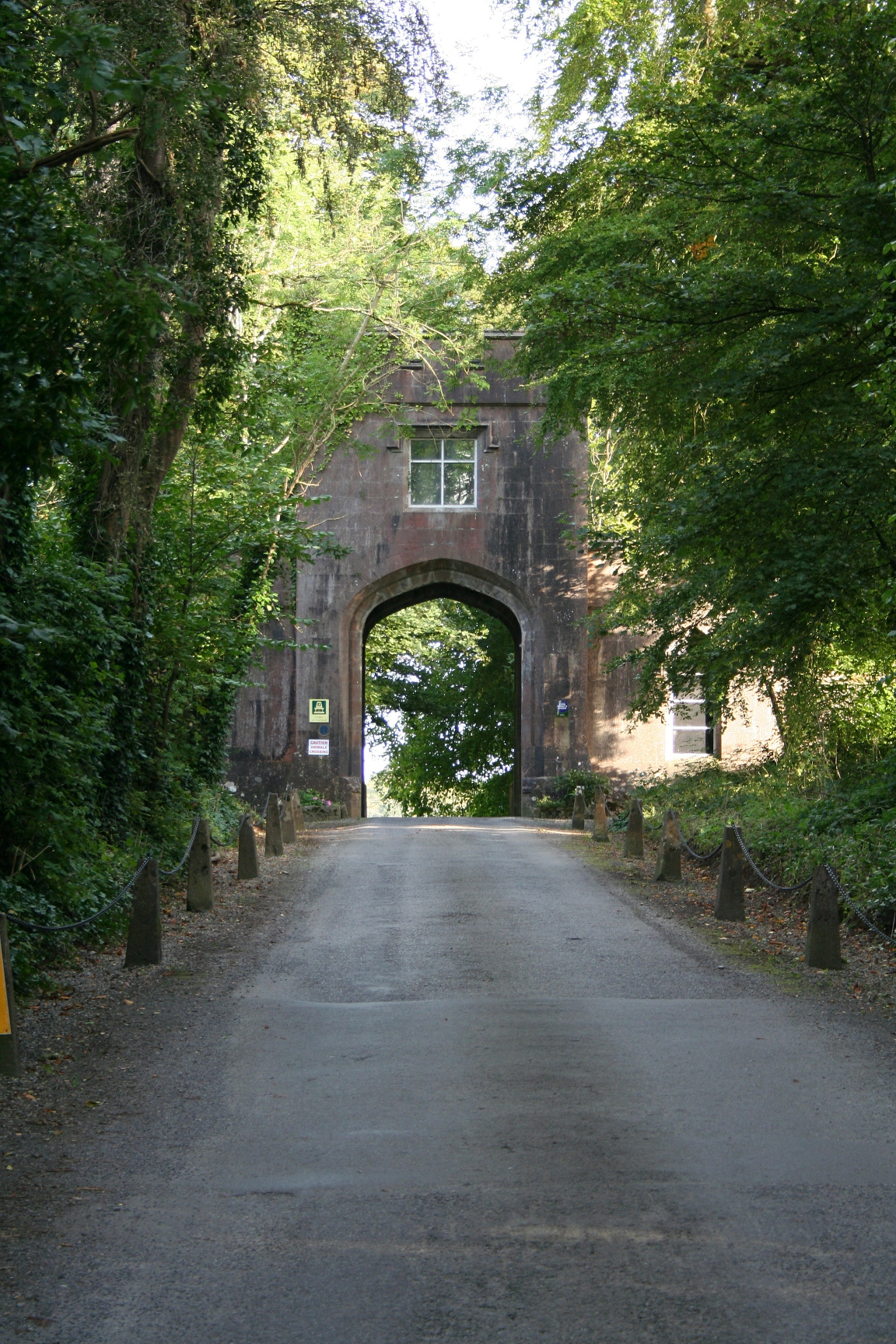
The entrance gate

In 1830, Colonel Edward Joshua Cooper MP (1798–1863) eldest son of Edward Synge Cooper MP, and Ann, daughter of Henry Vansittart, Governor of Bengal, set up Markree Observatory on the grounds of Markree Castle near Collooney in County Sligo.

In 1831 Cooper acquired from Robert A. Cauchoix of Paris an objective of 13.3-inches (~33.78 cm) for which he paid £1200. In 1834 he mounted the lens on an equatorial mounting supplied by Thomas Grubb of Dublin. For a number of years Cooper's big refractor was the largest in the world. He used the telescope to sketch Halley's comet in 1835 and to view the solar eclipse of 15 May 1836.

Later a 5-foot (1.5m) transit and a 3-foot (0.9m) meridian circle, fitted with an interchangeable 7-inch (17.75 cm) glass were added, which was the largest at that time in 1839; also in 1842 a 3-inch comet seeker was added.

The observatory had a Stevenson screen, invented in 1863.

"The Observatory of Mr Cooper of Markree Castle – undoubtedly the most richly furnished private observatory known – is worked with great activity by Mr Cooper himself and by his very able assistant, Mr Andrew Graham." (Royal Astronomical Society, 1851)

In 1848, Cooper's assistant, Andrew Graham, discovered the asteroid 9 Metis with a wide-field comet seeker telescope manufactured by Ertel. Graham resigned his post at Markree in 1860, but continued his research at Cambridge Observatory until his retirement in 1905. E.J. Cooper died in 1863, but the observatory remained active until the death of Edward Henry Cooper MP in 1902.

== The 13+ inch Cauchoix ==
The Cauchoix telescope was installed inside a circular wall, but it had no dome or roof over it. The enclosure has a diameter of 16-feet across.

The telescope mounting was made by Grubb of Dublin. (Grubb would make telescopes for a century and half, later known as Grubb-Parsons)

The telescope objective was doublet with 13.3 inches of aperture and 25 feet focal length. The Grubb mounting had a clockwork drive and weighed almost 2.4 metric tons (2.6 US tons), which rested on a limestone pillar.

The lens was ground by Cauchoix of Paris using glass blanks by Guinand. The 13.3 inch lens was completed in 1831.

Pierre-Louis Guinand (de fr) (20 April 1748, La Sagne — 13 February 1824, Les Brenets) was a Swiss who in the late 1700s came up with a breakthrough for making better quality and larger glass, and in time went on to teach a young Fraunhofer at Joseph von Utzschneider's (1763-1840) glassworks, and eventually started his own optical glass works. Guinand would supply glass for the Paris Observatory telescopes and also Cauchoix.

== Instruments ==
Examples:

- 1831 Troughton transit with a 5-inch Tulley objective
- 1839 Ertel 3-foot meridian circle with 7 inches aperture
- 1842 Ertel 3 inch aperture comet seeker
- 3 foot Dollond refractor. (length not aperture in this case)
- 13-inch Cauchoix objective on Grubb mount.

== See also ==
- Markree Castle
- Craig telescope (refractor of the 1850s)
- Leviathan of Parsonstown (Big Irish metal-mirror (1.8 m) reflector after 1845)
- 40-foot telescope (Herschel's)
- List of astronomical observatories
- List of largest optical telescopes in the 19th century
