= 9 Metis =

Main-belt asteroid

- VLT-SPHERE image of Metis

Discovery
- Discovered by: A. Graham
- Discovery date: 25 April 1848

Designations
- Pronunciation: /ˈmiːtɪs/
- Named after: Mētis
- Alternative designations: 1974 QU_{2}
- Minor planet category: Main belt
- Adjectives: Metidian /mɛˈtɪdiən/
- Symbol: (historical)

Orbital characteristics
- Epoch 13 September 2023 (JD 2460200.5)
- Aphelion: 2.68 AU (401 million km)
- Perihelion: 2.093 AU (313.1 million km)
- Semi-major axis: 2.387 AU (357.1 million km)
- Eccentricity: 0.1231
- Orbital period (sidereal): 3.69 yr (1346.74 d)
- Mean anomaly: 345.43°
- Inclination: 5.577°
- Longitude of ascending node: 68.87°
- Time of perihelion: 15 July 2027
- Argument of perihelion: 5.75°
- Earth MOID: 1.1 AU (160 million km)

Proper orbital elements
- Proper semi-major axis: 2.3864354 AU
- Proper eccentricity: 0.1271833
- Proper inclination: 4.6853629°
- Proper mean motion: 97.638314 deg / yr
- Proper orbital period: 3.68708 yr (1346.705 d)
- Precession of perihelion long.: 38.754973 arcsec / yr
- Precession of asc. node: −41.998090 arcsec / yr

Physical characteristics
- Dimensions: 218 × 176 × 133 km (± 10 × 10 × 8 km)
- Mean diameter: 173±2 km
- Mass: (6.49±0.10)×10^{18} kg (2025) (Note: Calculated from its standard gravitational parameter GM = 0.433±0.007 km^{3}/s^{2}.) (6.18±0.28)×10^{18} kg (2023)
- Mean density: 2.39±0.09 g/cm^{3} (2025); 2.28±0.13 g/cm^{3} (2023)
- Synodic rotation period: 5.079176±0.000001 h
- Axial tilt: 73°
- Pole ecliptic longitude: 181° ± 2°
- Pole ecliptic latitude: 22° ± 2°
- Geometric albedo: 0.18; 0.118
- Temperature: max: 282 K (+9 °C)
- Spectral type: S K
- Apparent magnitude: 8.1 to 11.83
- Absolute magnitude (H): 6.18; 6.31
- Angular diameter: 0.23" to 0.071"

9 Metis is one of the larger main-belt asteroids. It is composed of silicates and metallic nickel-iron, and may be the core remnant of a large asteroid that was destroyed by an ancient collision. Metis is estimated to contain just under half a percent of the total mass of the asteroid belt.

== Discovery and naming ==
The first 10 asteroids profiled against Earth's Moon. 9 Metis is second from right.

Metis was discovered by Andrew Graham on 25 April 1848, at Markree Observatory in Ireland; it was his only asteroid discovery. It was also the only asteroid to have been discovered as a result of observations from Ireland until 7 October 2008, when, 160 years later, Dave McDonald from Celbridge discovered 2008 TM_{9} (later named 281507 Johnellen). Its name comes from the mythological Metis, a Titaness and Oceanid, daughter of Tethys and Oceanus. The name Thetis was also considered and rejected (it would later devolve to 17 Thetis).

The historical symbol for Metis was an eye with a star above it. It was encoded in Unicode 17.0 as U+1CEC3 𜻃.

== Characteristics ==
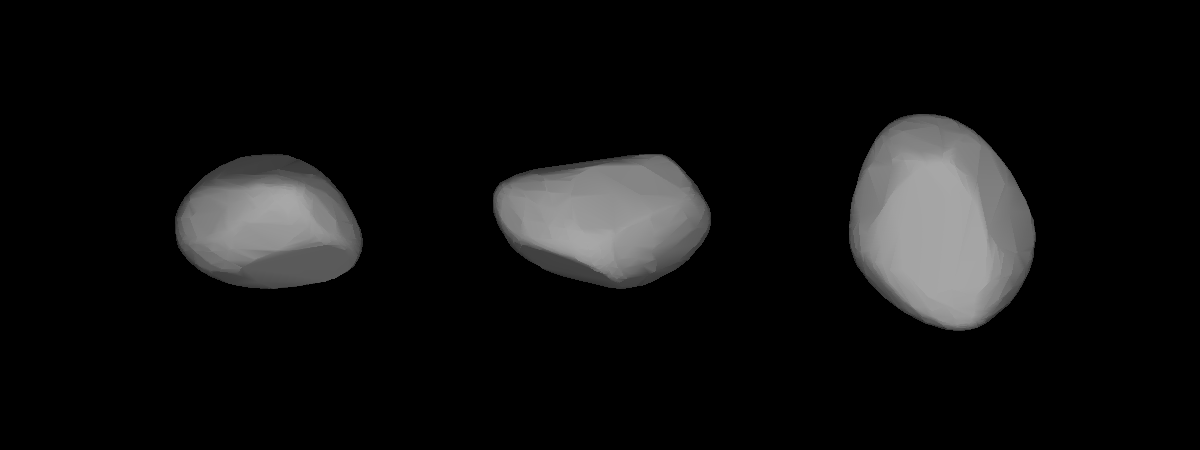
Lightcurve-based 3D-model of Metis

The direction of Metis's rotation pole points towards ecliptic coordinates (β, λ) = (22°, 181°) with a 2° uncertainty. The equivalent equatorial coordinates are (α, δ) = (12.7 h, 20°). This gives an axial tilt of 73°.

Hubble Space Telescope images and lightcurve analyses are in agreement that Metis has an irregular elongated shape with one pointed and one broad end. Radar observations suggest the presence of a significant flat area, in agreement with the shape model from lightcurves.

The Metidian surface composition has been estimated as 30–40% metal-bearing olivine and 60–70% Ni-Fe metal.

Light curve data on Metis led to an assumption that it could have a satellite. However, subsequent observations failed to confirm this. Later searches with the Hubble Space Telescope in 1993 found no satellites.

== Family relationships ==
Metis was once considered to be a member of an asteroid family known as the Metis family, but more recent searches for prominent families did not recognize any such group, nor is a clump evident in the vicinity of Metis by visual inspection of proper orbital element diagrams.

However, a spectroscopic analysis found strong spectral similarities between Metis and 113 Amalthea, and it is suggested that these asteroids may be remnants of a very old (at least ~1 Ga) dynamical family whose smaller members have been pulverised by collisions or perturbed away from the vicinity. The putative parent body is estimated to have been 300 to 600 km in diameter (Vesta-sized) and differentiated. Metis would be the relatively intact core remnant (though smaller than 16 Psyche), and Amalthea a fragment of the mantle, with 90% of the original body unaccounted for. Coincidentally, both Metis and Amalthea have namesakes among Jupiter's inner moons.

== Occultations ==
In 1984 an occultation of a star produced seven chords that Kristensen used to derive an ellipsoidal profile of 210×170 km. On 6 August 1989, Metis occulted a magnitude 8.7 star producing five chords suggesting a diameter of 173.5 km. Observations of an occultation on 11 February 2006, produced only two chords indicating a minimum diameter 156 km. All three of these occultations fit the ellipsoid 222×182×130 km suggested by Baer.

On 7 March 2014, Metis occulted the star HIP 78193 (magnitude 7.9) over parts of Europe and the Middle East.

== See also ==
- List of former planets
- Comet seeker
