= Andrew Graham (astronomer) =

Irish astronomer

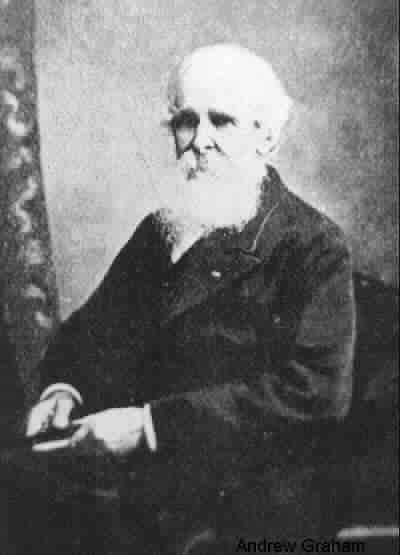
- Born: 8 April 1815; County Fermanagh, Ireland
- Died: 5 November 1908 (aged 93); Cambridge, Cambridgeshire, England
- Occupations: Astronomer, Methodist preacher
- Spouse: Mary (c. 1813–1883)
- Children: Henry William Graham (born 1848), Harriet Emily Graham (born 1850), Samuel George Graham (1846–1867)

Andrew Graham (8 April 1815 – 5 November 1908) was an Irish astronomer, orbit computer and discoverer of the asteroid 9 Metis.

== Astronomer at Markree, County Sligo ==
In 1842 Graham was appointed to work at Markree Observatory in County Sligo in northwest Ireland. The observatory had been established in 1830 by Colonel Edward Joshua Cooper (1798–1863) as a private institution on his country estate. Cooper equipped it with excellent astronomical instruments. Graham proved an energetic observer at Markree.

Graham discovered the asteroid 9 Metis from Markree on 25 April 1848 while observing with a 3-inch aperture wide-field telescope manufactured for comet searching by the German instrument maker Ertel.

Only eight minor planets were known before then, with the first four having been found in the period 1801–1807, and Graham's discovery consequently attracted considerable attention. His mathematical abilities allowed him to compute the orbit of the minor planet and to predict its apparent position into the future, including the gravitational effects of planets on its orbit around the Sun.

Graham later worked on the Markree Catalogue, which consisted of observations of about sixty thousand stars along the ecliptic taken between 8 August 1848 and 27 March 1856, and was published in four volumes in the years 1851, 1853, 1854 and 1856 respectively. Whilst working on this, he developed the square-bar micrometer, which greatly increased the efficiency of determining positions (right ascension and declination) of celestial objects.

Graham calculated the orbits of a large number of comets. These were used in his employer's book Cometic Orbits.

Graham resigned from his position at Markree and began new employment in Cambridge in March 1864.

Asteroids discovered: 1
9 Metis	25 April 1848

== Assistant at the Cambridge Observatory ==
Graham worked as First Assistant at the Cambridge Observatory, England, from 1864 to 1903.

There he worked on the Cambridge Zone Catalogue, the Observatory's contribution to the catalogue of stars brighter than magnitude 9.5 organised by the Astronomische Gesellschaft in Germany. This was in many ways an extension of his work at Markree, but for stars some distance to the north of the ecliptic. The catalogue of 14,464 stars between declinations 24° and 31° north was published in 1897.

Graham collaborated with Anne Walker in the observing, who, although employed as a `lady computer' to perform routine mathematical calculations, regularly shared the observing tasks with Graham in a successful professional partnership.

Graham retired from his post at the Cambridge Observatory in 1903 at the age of 88 years. He was granted a pension by the University of Cambridge. He died in Cambridge in 1908 aged 93 years.
