= Howard Grubb =

Irish optical engineer (1844–1931)

Sir Howard Grubb FRS FRAS
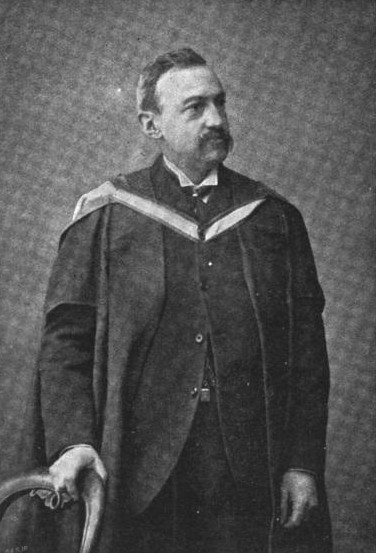
- Born: 28 July 1844; Dublin, Ireland
- Died: 16 September 1931 (aged 87)
- Education: Trinity College Dublin
- Notable work: Reflector sight
- Spouse: Mary Walker (m. 1871)
- Children: 6
- Parent: Thomas Grubb (father)
- Awards: Cunningham Medal (1881); FRS (1883); Knighthood (1887); Boyle Medal (1912)
- Engineering career
- Discipline: Optical engineering
- Employer: Grubb Telescope Company
- Significant advance: Sight; Periscope

Sir Howard Grubb FRS FRAS (28 July 1844 – 16 September 1931) was an Irish optical engineer. He was head of a family firm that made large optical telescopes, telescope drive controls, and other optical instruments. He is also noted for his work to perfect the periscope and invent the reflector sight.

== Biography ==
Howard Grubb was one of eight children of Thomas Grubb, founder of the Grubb Telescope Company, and his wife, Sarah. Howard developed an early interest in optics. He began his studies in Trinity College Dublin in 1863 but did not complete his degree. After training to be a civil engineer, Howard joined his father's firm in 1864 and gained the reputation of being a first class producer of telescopes. In 1871, he married Mary Walker, with whom he had six children.

Grubb was elected a fellow of the Royal Astronomical Society in 1870 and a fellow of the Royal Society in 1883. In 1876, he was awarded an honorary Masters in Engineering by Trinity College Dublin. The asteroid 1058 Grubba is named after him.

In 1887, he was knighted by Lord Lieutenant at Dublin castle. Sir Howard was a longtime member of the Royal Dublin Society, serving as Honorary Secretary from 1889 to 1893, and as vice-president from 1893 to 1922. In 1912, he was awarded the medal of the Society, only the third person to receive it. Sir Howard Grubb died in 1931.

== Optical work ==
Under Howard Grubb, the Grubb Telescope Company gained an even greater reputation for quality optical instruments. Grubb was also known for building accurate electrically driven clock drives for equatorial mounted telescopes. Some of the telescopes produced by Howard Grubb include the 27-inch refractor for the Vienna Observatory (1878), the 10-inch refractor at Armagh Observatory (1882), the 28-inch refractor at the Royal Observatory, Greenwich – the UK's largest refractor (1893), and the 10-inch refractor at Coats Observatory, Paisley (1898). In 1887, Grubb's firm built seven normal astrographs for the Carte du Ciel international photographic star catalogue project, 13-inch refracting telescopes all designed to produce uniform photographic plates.

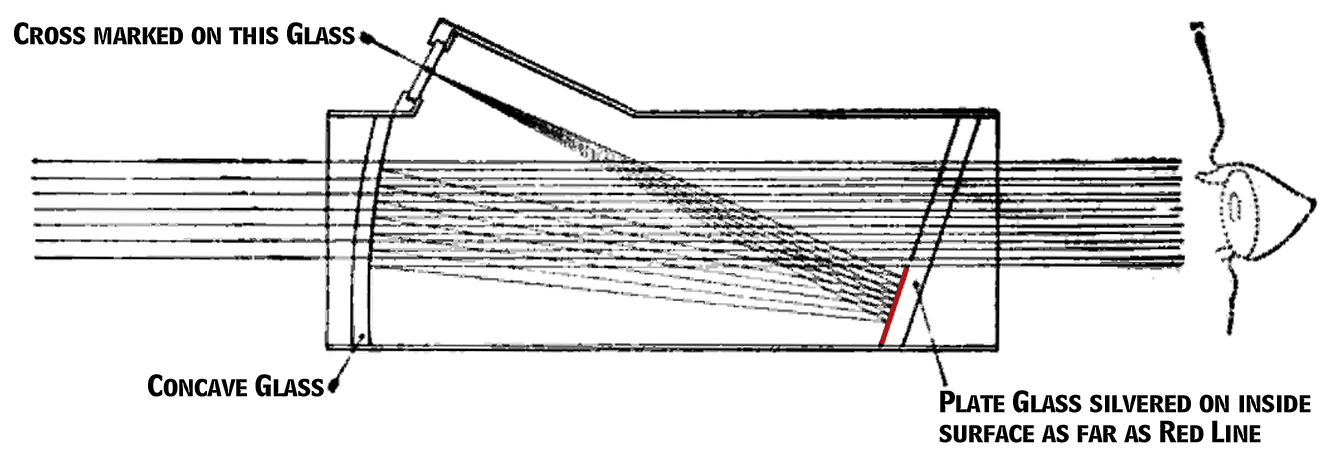
1901 diagram of one of Howard Grubb's collimating reflector sights. This version was designed to make it compact for use on firearms and other equipment.

In 1900, Grubb invented the reflector or "reflex" sight, a non-magnifying optical sight that uses a collimator to allow the viewer looking through the sight to see an illuminated image of a reticle or other pattern in front of them that stays in alignment with the device the sight is attached to (parallax free). This type of sight has come to be used on all kinds of weapons from small firearms to fighter aircraft. It is also at the heart of all modern head-up displays.

During the First World War, the Grubb factory was in demand for the production of telescopic gun-sights and during this time he was credited with perfecting a periscope design for Royal Navy submarines.

== See also ==
- List of astronomical instrument makers
