= Afocal photography =

Method of photography

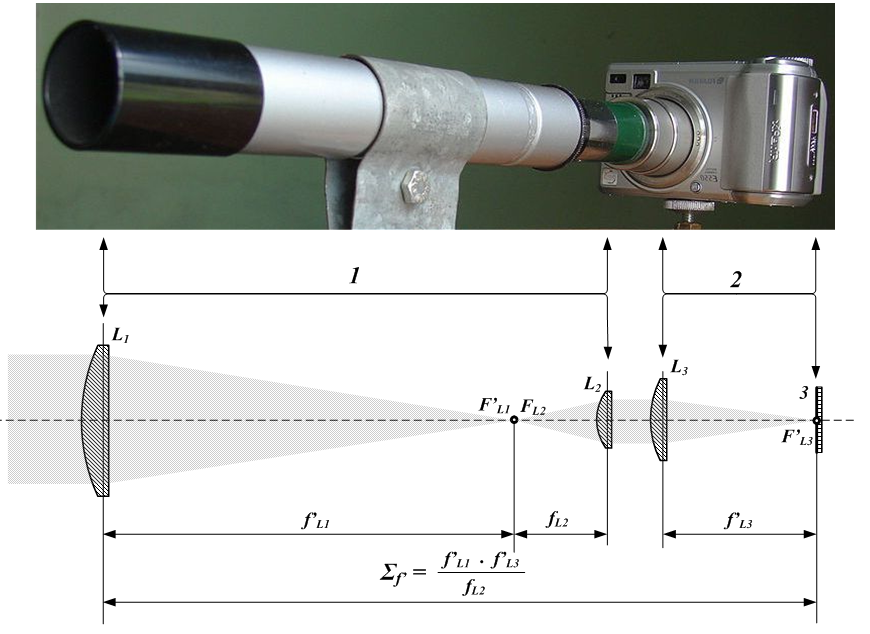
An afocal setup with a digital camera and a finderscope with optical diagram: 1 - Telescope 2 - Camera 3 - Film or CCD plane L1 - Telescope objective L2 - Eyepiece L3 - Camera lens

Afocal photography, also called afocal imaging or afocal projection is a method of photography where the camera with its lens attached is mounted over the eyepiece of another image forming system such as an optical telescope or optical microscope, with the camera lens taking the place of the human eye.

== Overview ==
Afocal photography works with any system that can produce a virtual image of parallel light, for example telescopes and microscopes. Afocal photographic setups work because the imaging device's eyepiece produces collimated light and with the camera's lens focused at infinity, creating an afocal system with no net convergence or divergence in the light path between the two devices. In this system the device is focused on the object and the camera is placed above the eyepiece as close as possible. The drawback is the system will have a high focal ratio, with a correspondingly dim image, and some vignetting. A high focal ratio also means the field of view will be narrow. Field of view can be calculated using:

Focal field of view/angle of view:

Approximate: $\alpha = {d \over f} \times {180 \over \pi} \equiv {180 d \over \pi f}$
Precise: $\alpha = 2 \arctan {d \over 2 f}$

== Use with optical telescopes ==
One method of afocal photography is to mount a camera with its lens attached behind the eyepiece of a Keplerian optical telescope, the combination giving the photographer a long focus lens. Historically afocal photography with 35 mm SLR or large format film cameras was a very difficult method of photography. With film cameras the bulk and mechanical shake had to be taken into consideration, with some setups employing a separate tripod for the camera (adding the complexity of setting up the camera in relation to the eyepiece). The general difficulties of focus and exposure with film cameras, along with the detailed mathematical calculations, combined with the time lag of waiting for the film to be developed, made film afocal photography challenging.

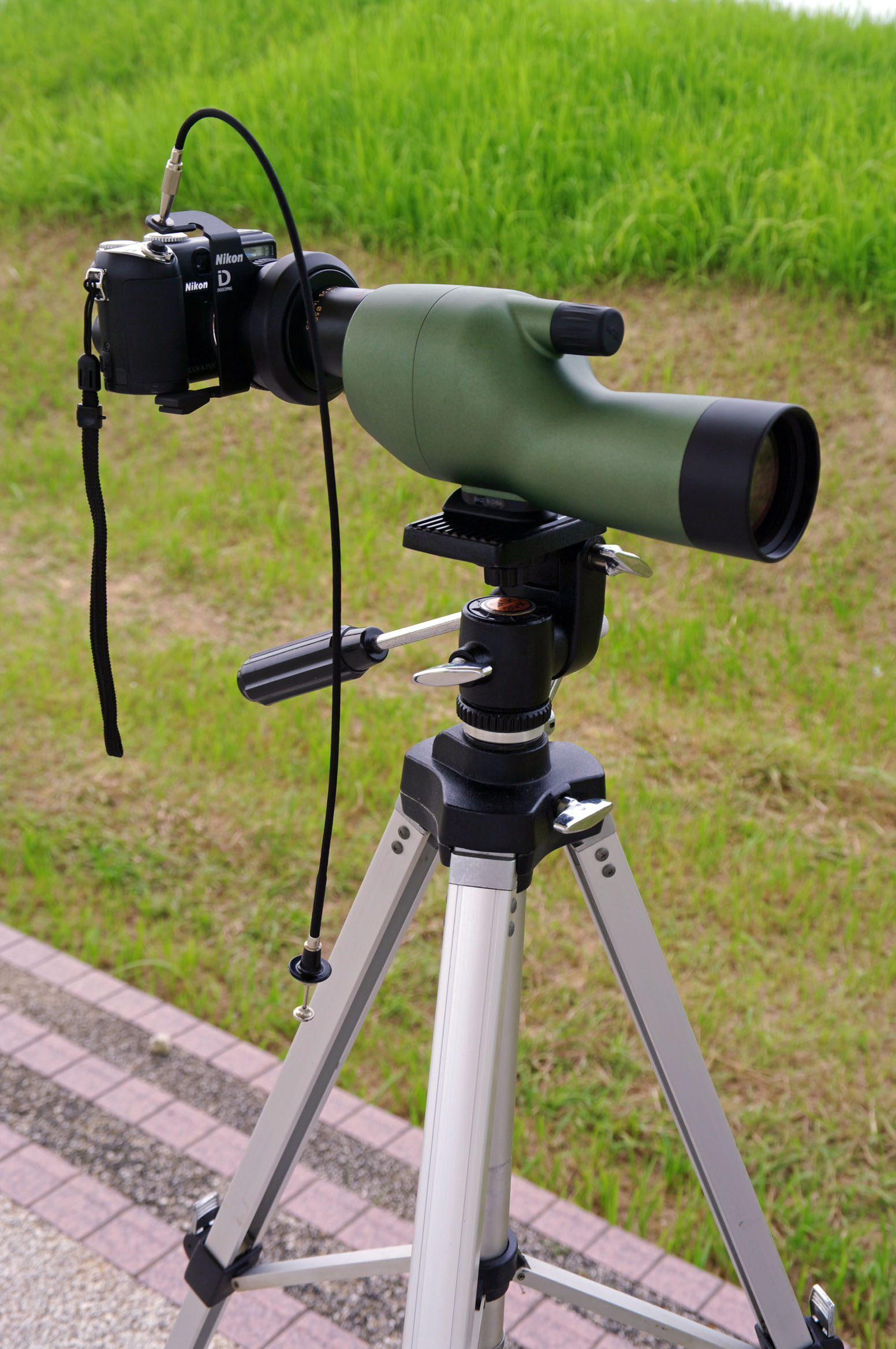
Spotting scope with a digital camera mounted afocally using an adapter.

=== Digital afocal photography ===
The advent of digital single-lens reflex camera and, moreover, compact point and shoot digital cameras has made the afocal method far more popular since this type of camera is small enough to mount directly on to telescopes or other devices, is for the most part a solid state device with minimal moving parts, has auto focus, has auto exposure adjustment, has some capacity for time exposure, usually has a zoom mechanism to crop vignetting, and has a digital viewframe that allows the user to see the image hitting the viewing plane. Couplers and other devices for mounting digital cameras afocally are commercially available. Simply holding the camera up to the eyepiece and snapping a picture can obtain usable results. Most popular types of consumer digital cameras have non-removable lenses so afocal photography is also the only method available for these types of cameras.

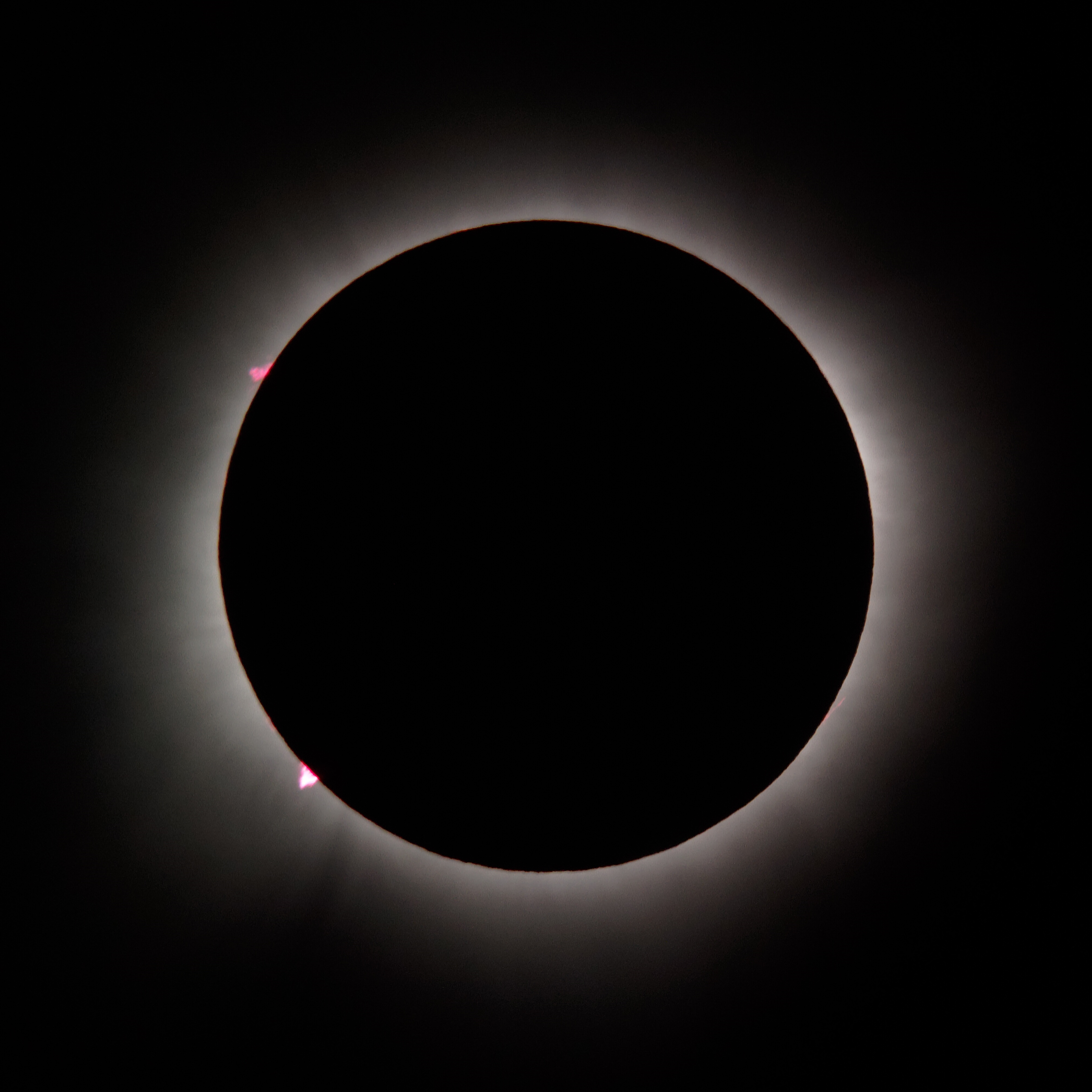
An afocal astrophotograph of the total solar eclipse of April 8, 2024, taken with an Asus ZenFone 9 and a Celestron C5+ through a 32 mm Plössl eyepiece.

=== Afocal astrophotography ===
Afocal photography is a form of astrophotography long practiced by astronomers. Afocal setups with film and digital cameras are not the preferred system for astrophotography since astrophotographers have many ways of coupling a camera to an astronomical telescope, the simplest being prime focus (using no camera lens and allowing the image to fall directly onto the film, or image plane of a digital single-lens reflex camera or purpose built astronomical CCD camera). Almost from their invention amateur astronomers were adapting compact digital still and video cameras for use in afocal astrophotography.

But since most celestial objects require a long exposure, compact consumer digital cameras are somewhat problematic due to their high inherent sensor noise. This noise limits their usefulness, especially since point-objects, such as stars, can be obscured by even one "hot" pixel. The narrow field of view for this type of photography lends itself to lunar and planetary objects. Continuing advancements in digital camera and image manipulation have somewhat overcome this limitation and digital afocal astrophotography has become more popular.

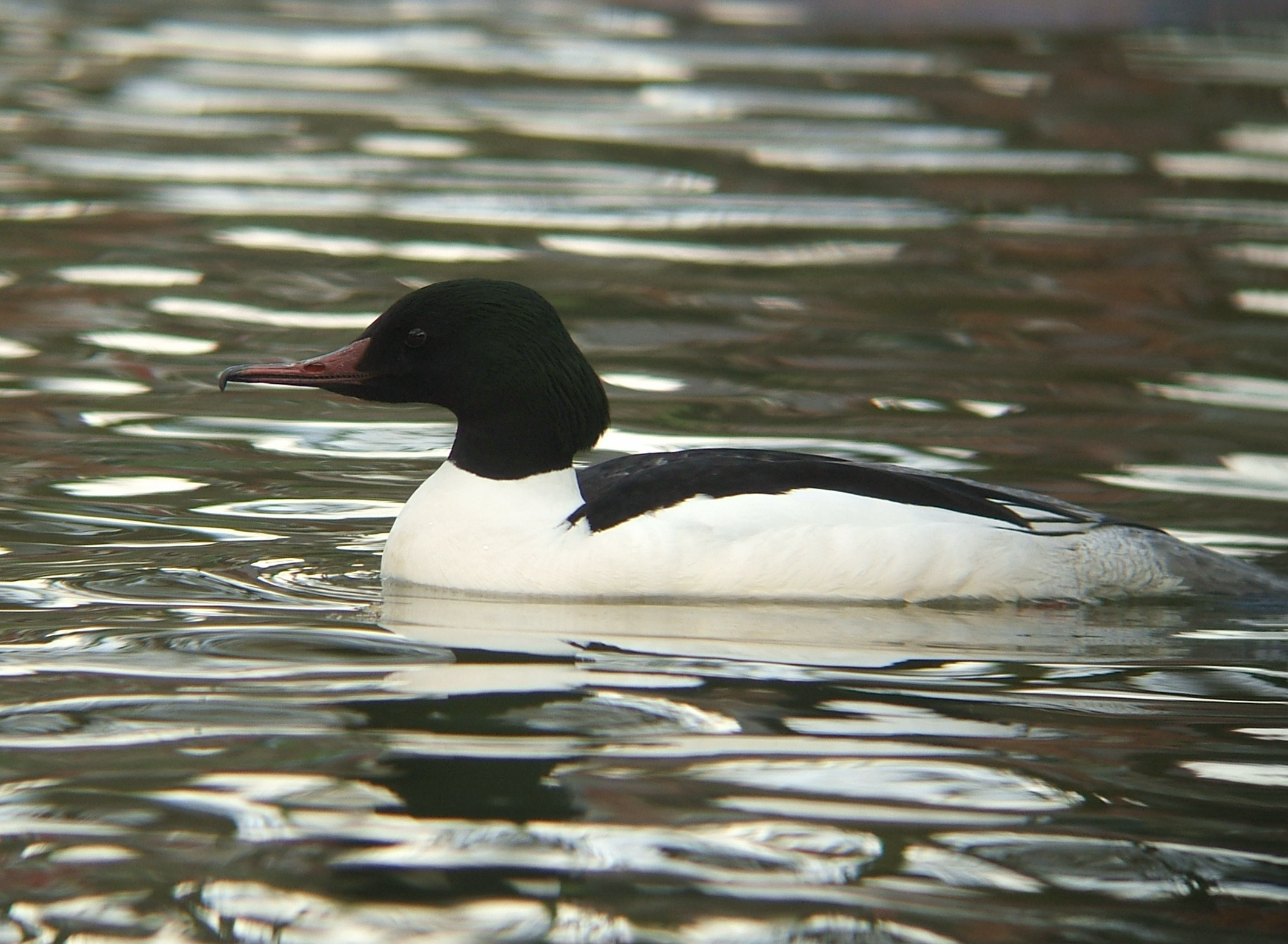
A "digiscoped" photo of a goosander, taken with a Fujifilm digital camera and a Kowa spotting scope

=== Daytime afocal photography ===
Since the development of compact digital cameras, afocal photography is also widely used by birdwatchers, naturalists, and other photographers. In the birdwatching community it quickly acquired the coined name of “digiscoping”. Birdwatchers and naturalists found a digital camera used afocally with a spotting scope to be a particularly effective technique since it gave them an easy way to record their subjects (sometimes by simply holding the camera up to the eyepiece) as well as allowing them to take relatively high quality photographs. Since these types of photographs are usually single subjects (narrow field) in daylight hours, the light loss and narrow angle of view are not a hindrance, and the high effective focal lengths are beneficial. It also facilitates the use of a very long lens without buying and transporting extra equipment, other than perhaps a small afocal adapter.

This technique has lent itself to many other types of photography including photographing plants (for example, wild orchids growing in the canopy of a jungle), insects (for example, wild bees near their beehive), other shy or dangerous wild animals, or details in old buildings (for example, statues/gargoyles on the roof of old churches/castles).

== Afocal secondary lenses ==
Besides combining a Keplerian telescope with a camera, there are also dedicated secondary lens afocal attachments that mount on the front of a camera lens to work in the role of a teleconverter, technically called teleside converters. These lenses are usually Galilean telescopes that alter the width of the entering beam of light without affecting the divergence of the beam, so they can change the effective focal length 1 to 3 times without increasing focal ratio. There are models that are 6x or 8x and even Russian made 12x to 14x Gregorian Maksutov designs that can be used as long lenses and microscopes. Like their Keplerian counterparts these can be universally adapted to most camera lenses with the proper type of adapter.

== See also ==
- Outline of photography
