= George Dollond =

- Born: 10 June 1774; London
- Died: 30 November 1852 (aged 78); Camberwell, London
- Known for: Barlow lens

George Dollond (10 June 1774 – 30 November 1852) was an English optician who constructed precision optical instruments used in astronomy, geodesy and also in navigation. Together with Peter Barlow, he also invented an afocal system to extend the focal length of telescopes, called the Barlow lens.

== Biography ==
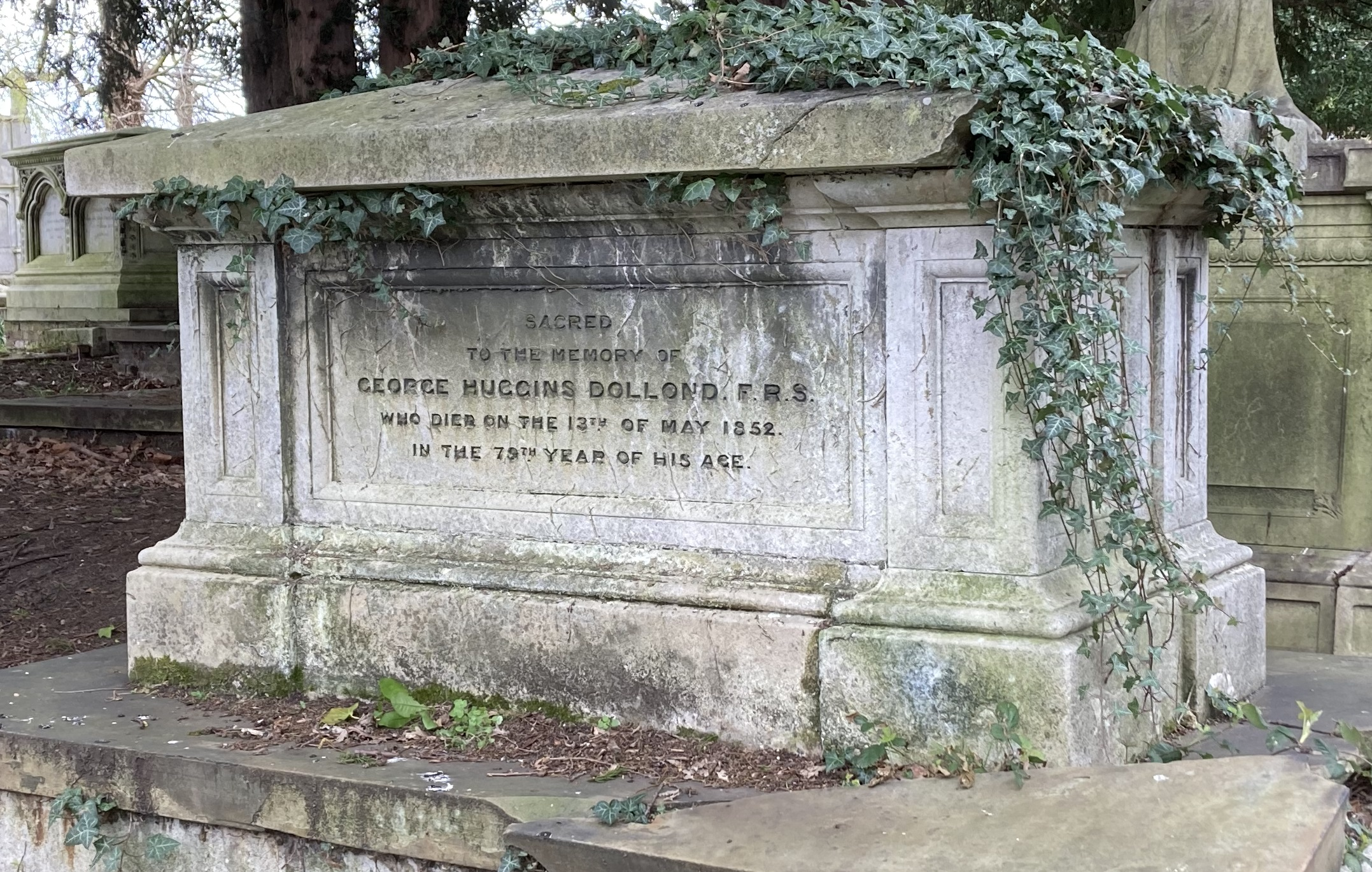
Grave of George Dolland in West Norwood Cemetery

He was born in London, the nephew of the famous optician Peter Dollond. He was the son of John Dollond's daughter, Susan (or Susanne) (1728–1798) who married William Huggins. His father died when he was a child. When George Huggins went into partnership with Peter Dollond in 1805, he changed his name by licence to Dollond.

He was elected a Fellow of the Royal Society in December 1819.

In 1820 Peter Dollond and George Dollond became opticians to George IV. In the same year, he was one of the founding Fellows of the Royal Astronomical Society.

He died in 1852 at Camberwell Terrace North and was buried at West Norwood Cemetery. His business interests were inherited by his nephew and former apprentice, George Huggins (1797–1866), who in the same year changed his surname to Dollond.
