= Chinon Genesis IV =

35mm single-lens reflex (SLR) camera

The Chinon Genesis IV was a 35mm Single Lens Reflex (SLR) camera manufactured by the Japanese camera maker Chinon. It was the final incarnation of the Genesis line of fixed zoom SLRs, which were manufactured in the late 1980s and early 1990s.

The Genesis IV featured ergonomical styling and most functions were automated. It had a fixed (i.e., non-interchangeable) motorized 38-135mm (f/4.0-5.6) autofocus zoom lens, a built-in flash with a red-eye reduction mode, TTL metering, an LCD status panel, and a fully automatic film-transport system. The lens accepted standard screw-on 58mm filters. An Optional 0.8x wide angle or 1.4x teleside converter could be fitted in front of the lens, and Chinon also offered external flash units.

The camera was positioned as a step up for amateur photographers who were ready to move beyond basic Point-and-Shoot models. The ability to override automated features was quite limited; there was, for example, no manual focus ring, and exposure was computer controlled with a limited range of exposure compensation. An unusual feature of the camera was an Auto Composing Mode in which the camera could automatically zoom to the focal length it deemed most appropriate for a given scene. Also unusual for its time was a dual autofocus system (using both passive phase detection and an infrared sensor), and the inclusion of a Slow Flash Sync mode that allowed for better balancing of ambient and flash light.

== The Genesis product family ==
The Genesis camera family consisted of 4 models (see table below), each new model replacing the previous one. All models had a fixed zoom, motorized stepless autofocus, autoexposure, a built-in pop-up flash, motorized film transport, and automatic (DX) film sensing. The first two releases had fairly boxy designs; the latter two were given a sleeker, more rounded look.

	Genesis (GS-7)	Genesis II (GS-8)	Genesis III	Genesis IV
Lens Focal Range	35mm - 80mm (Zoom lever)	35mm - 80mm (Zoom lever)	38mm - 110mm Powered Zoom	38mm - 135mm Powered Zoom
Lens Accessories	105mm teleside converter, 62mm screw-in filters	105mm teleside converter, 62mm screw-in filters	1.4x teleside converter, 58mm screw-in filters	0.8x Wide-angle, and 1.4x teleside converter, 58mm screw-in filters
Lens Max Aperture	f/4.1-6.4	f/4.1-6.4	f/4.4-5.6	f/4.0-5.6
Lens Construction	8 elements in 7 groups	8 elements in 7 groups	12 elements in 11 groups	13 elements in 10 groups
Focus distance	0.85m(33.5 in) - infinity	0.85m(33.5 in) - infinity	0.85m(33.5 in) - infinity	0.85m(33.5 in) - infinity
Focus System	Active IR	Active IR	Dual Mode Passive Phase TTL and Active IR	Dual Mode Passive Phase TTL and Active IR
Shutter Speed	1/4 - 1/300	1/4 - 1/300	1 - 1/1000, Bulb	1 - 1/1200, Bulb
Exposure Modes	Program AE, Slow Sync AE	Program AE, Slow Sync AE	Program AE, Slow Sync AE, Action, Creative	Program AE, Slow Sync AE, Action, Creative
Exposure Metering	Average TTL	Average TTL	Average TTL	Average TTL
Shooting Mode	Single, Continuous 1 frame/s, Self, Multi 3 on 1 frame	Single, Continuous 1 frame/s, Self, Multi 3 on 1 frame	Single, Continuous 1.5 frame/s, Self, Multi unlimited	Single, Continuous 1.5 frame/s, Self, Multi unlimited
Flash	GN 12 (at ISO 100), 3 sec recycle time	GN 12, 3 sec	GN 14, 4 sec	GN 14, 4 sec, Red-eye preflash
