= Teleconversion =

Teleconversion may refer to:

- changing a telephone number on a line to another number
- use of a teleconverter lens on a camera
