= Diopter (disambiguation) =

In modern usage, diopter or dioptre is a measure of the optical power of an optical system.

Diopter may also refer to:

- Historically, a dioptric lens
- Any lens system, such as a telescope
- A diopter sight
- A close-up lens used in photography
- A theodolite or similar surveyor's angle measuring device
- A dioptra, an old surveying device
- An alidade
- A surgical speculum
- An instrument for drawing the skull by projections

== See also ==
- Dioptrice
- Dioptrics
