= Long-focus lens =

Camera lens with big focal length

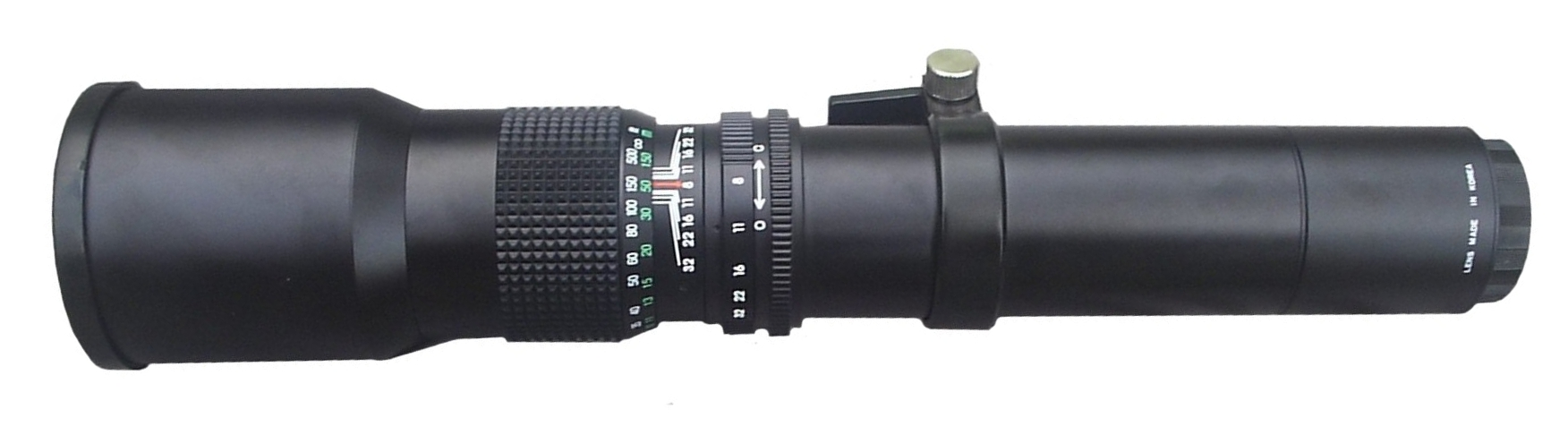
A 500 mm telephoto lens with extension tube

In photography, a long-focus lens is a camera lens which has a focal length that is longer than the diagonal measure of the film or sensor that receives its image. It is used to make distant objects appear magnified with magnification increasing as longer focal length lenses are used. A long-focus lens is one of three basic photographic lens types classified by relative focal length, the other two being a normal lens and a wide-angle lens. As with other types of camera lenses, the focal length is usually expressed in a millimeter value written on the lens, for example: a 500 mm lens. The most common type of long-focus lens is the telephoto lens, which incorporate a special lens group known as a telephoto group to make the physical length of the lens shorter than the focal length.

== Effects ==
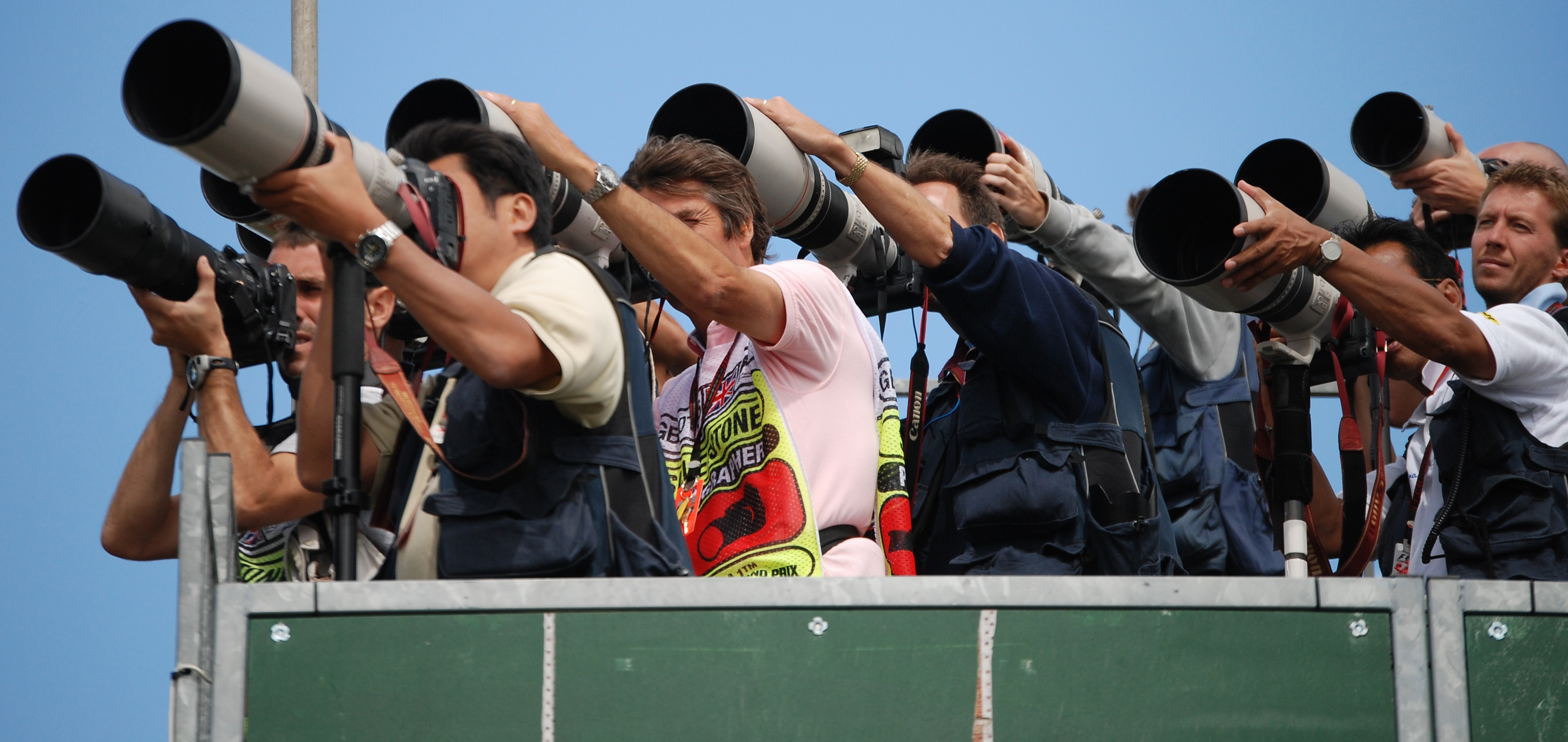
Sports photographers using long-focus lenses

Long-focus lenses are best known for making distant objects appear magnified. This effect is similar to moving closer to the object, but is not the same, since perspective is a function solely of viewing location. Two images taken from the same location, one with a wide angle lens and the other with a long-focus lens, will show identical perspective, in that near and far objects appear the same relative size to each other. Comparing magnification by using a long lens to magnification by moving closer, however, the long-focus-lens shot appears to compress the distance between objects due to the perspective from the more distant location. Long lenses thus give a photographer an alternative to the type of perspective distortion exhibited by shorter focal length lenses where (when the photographer stands closer to the given subject) different portions of a subject in a photograph can appear out of proportion to each other.

Long lenses also make it easier to blur the background more, even when the depth of field is the same; photographers will sometimes use this effect to defocus the background in an image to "separate" it from the subject. This background blurring is often referred to as bokeh by photographers. Long lenses are often used with a tripod, because of the increased weight and the fact that the effect of camera shake is magnified.

=== Still photography ===
Effect of different focal lengths on photographs taken from the same place:

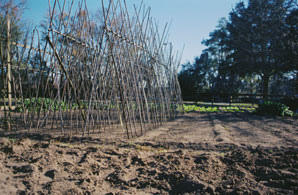
28 mm

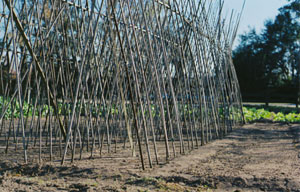
50 mm

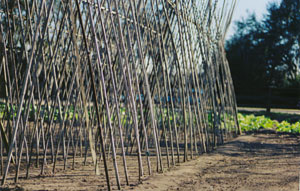
70 mm

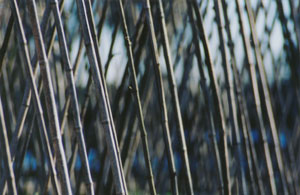
210 mm

The above photos were taken using a 35 mm camera, using lenses of the given focal lengths.

=== Constant object size ===
The photographer often moves to keep the same image size on the film for a particular object. Observe in the comparison images below that although the foreground object remains the same size, the background changes size; thus, perspective is dependent on the distance between the photographer and the subject. The longer focus lenses compress the perception of depth, and the shorter focus exaggerate it. This effect is also used for dolly zooms. The perspective of the so-called normal lens, 50 mm focal length for 35 mm film format, is conventionally regarded as a "correct" perspective, though a longer lens is usually preferred for a more pleasing perspective for portraits.

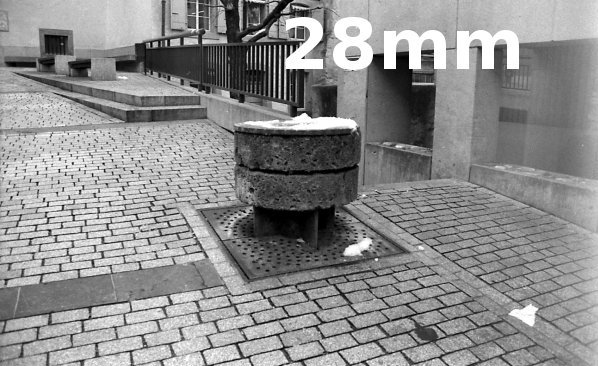
28 mm

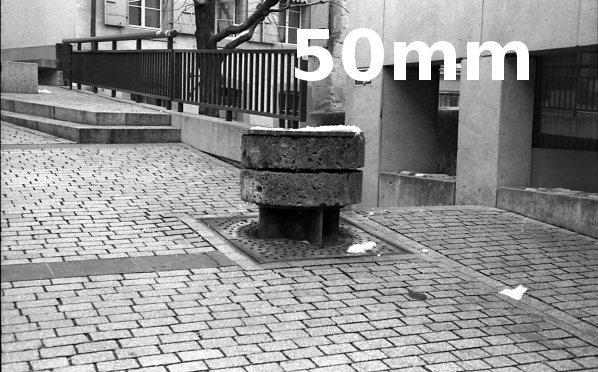
50 mm

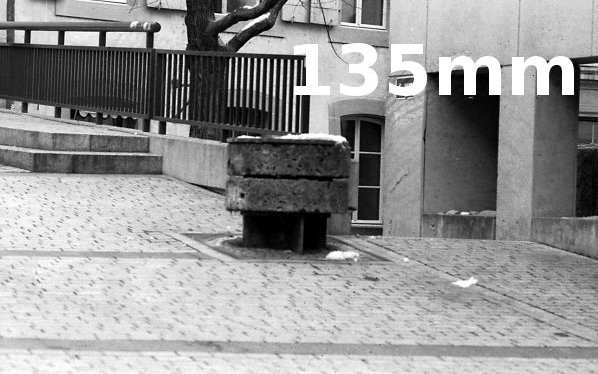
135 mm

== Telescopes as long-focus lenses ==
From the invention of photography in the 19th century, images have been captured using standard optical telescopes including telescope objectives adapted as early portrait lenses. Besides being used in an astronomical role in astrophotography, telescopes are adapted as long-focus lenses in nature photography, surveillance, machine vision and long-focus microscopy.

To use a telescope as a camera lens requires an adapter for the standard 1.25 inch tube eyepiece mount, usually a T-mount adapter, which in turn attaches to an adapter for the system camera's particular lens mount. Controlling exposure is done by exposure time, gain, or filters since telescopes almost always lack diaphragms for aperture adjustment. The 1.25 inch mount is smaller than many film and sensor formats so they tend to show vignetting around the field edges. Telescopes are normally intended for visual use, so they are not corrected to produce a large flat field like dedicated camera lenses and tend to show optical aberration.

Since the late 1990s compact digital cameras have been used in afocal photography, a technique where the camera lens is left attached, taking a picture directly through the telescope's eyepiece lens itself, also referred to as "digiscoping."

== See also ==
- Film format
- Secret photography
- Photographic lens design
