= Extension tube =

Tool for macro photography

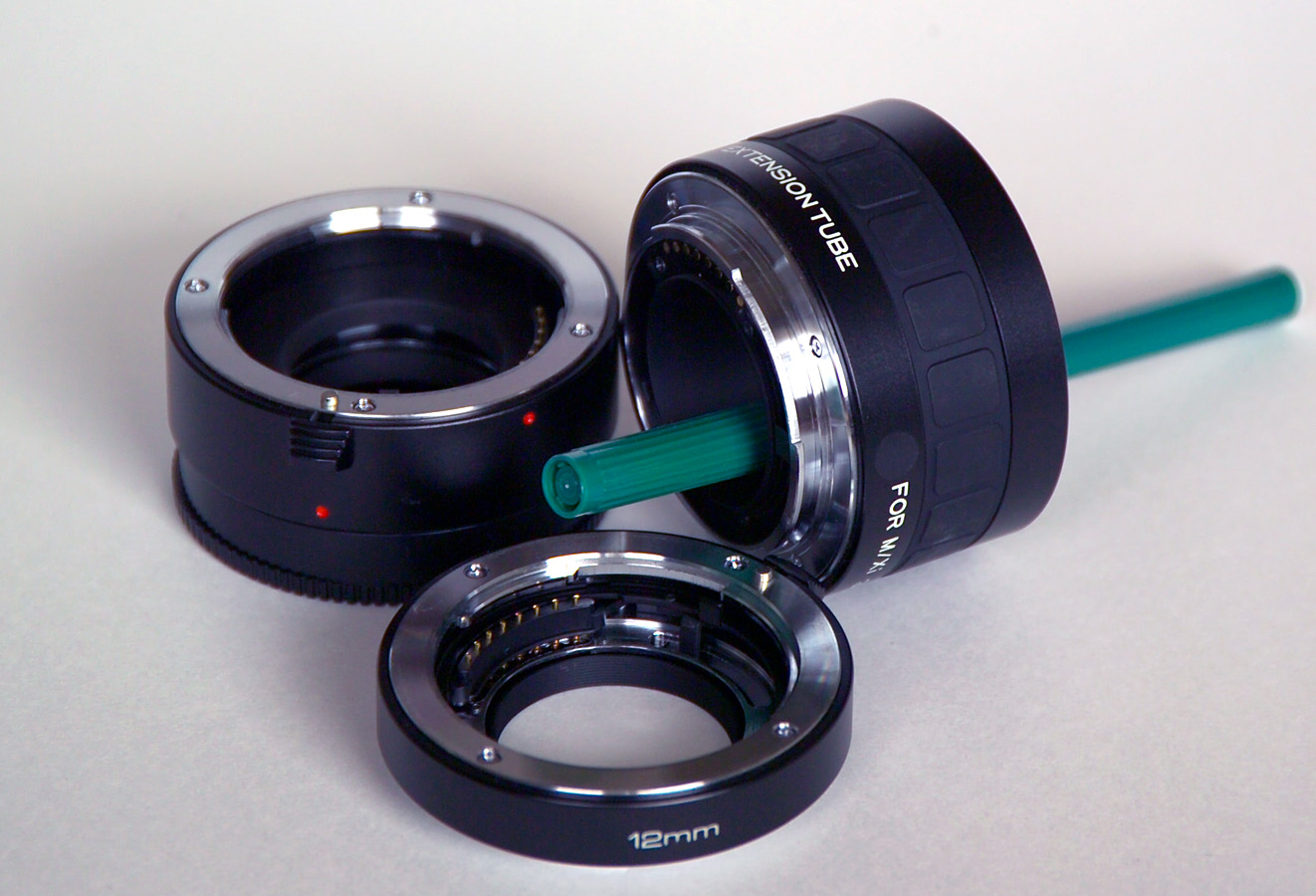
A set of extension tubes with a pen illustrating the lack of internal lenses

An extension tube, sometimes also called a closeup tube or an extension ring, is used with interchangeable lenses to increase magnification. This is most often used in macro photography.

== Construction ==
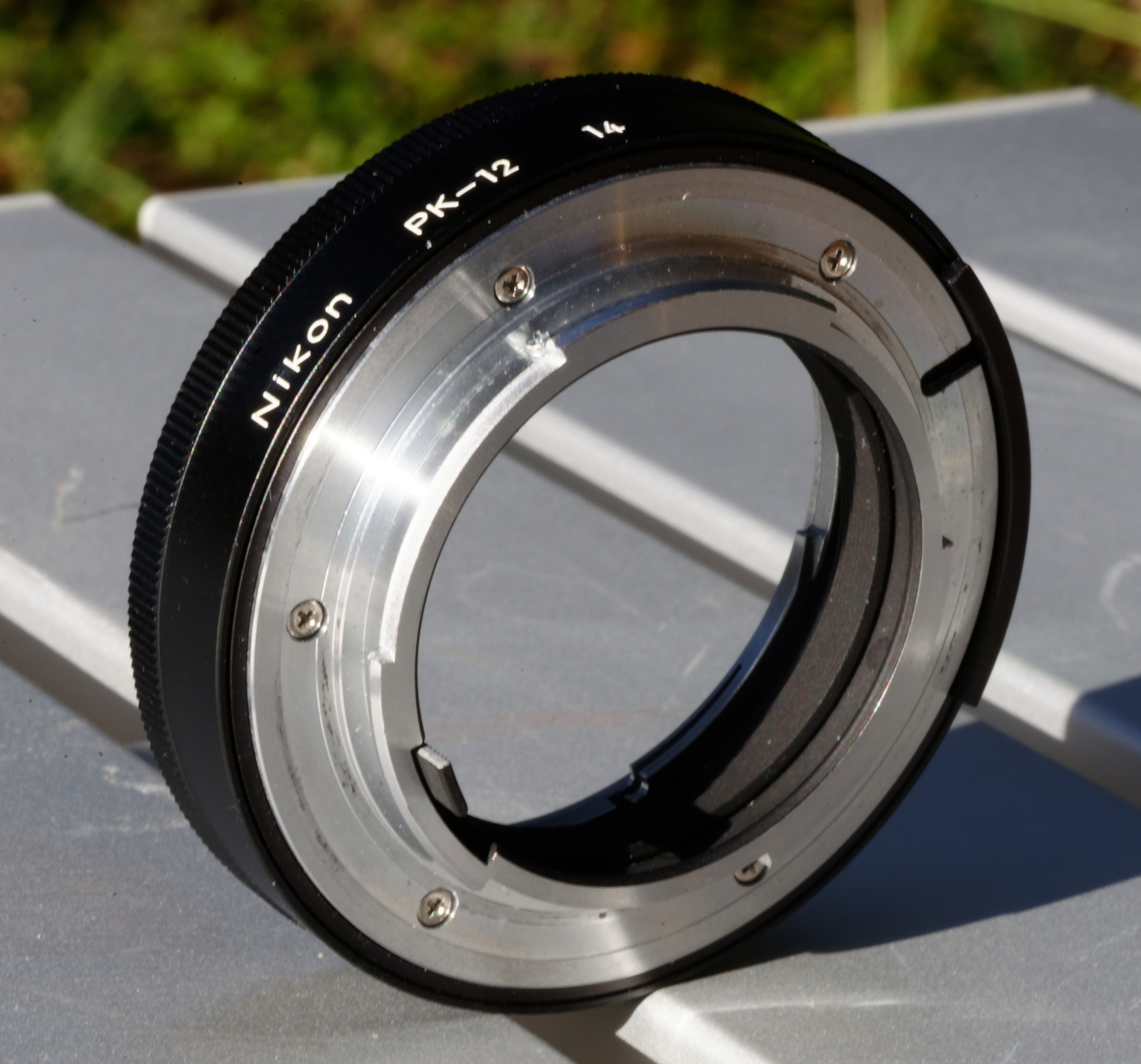
Nikon F-mount extension tube

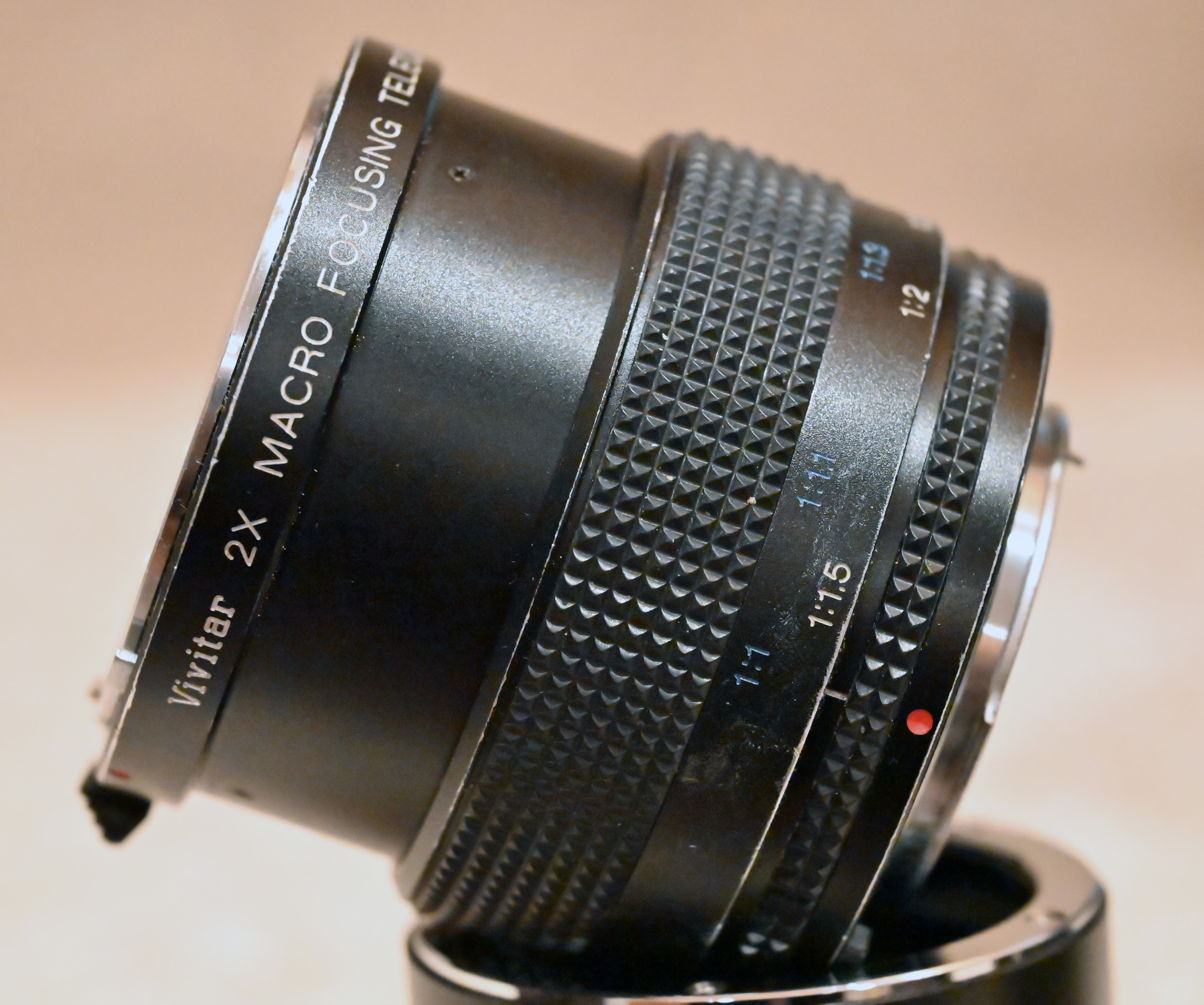
Vivitar zoom teleconverter, which acts like a zoom extension tube

The tube contains no optical elements; its sole purpose is to move the lens further from the image plane. The further away the lens is, the closer the focus, the greater the magnification, and also the greater the loss of light (requiring a longer exposure time). Lenses classically focus closer than infinity by moving all optical elements further from the film or sensor; an extension tube simply enables this movement. A tube increases the magnification by an amount roughly equal to its length divided by the focal length of the lens: a 25 mm tube adds about 0.5× to a 50 mm lens, so extension tubes give little extra magnification with long telephoto lenses. Manufacturers commonly offer tubes about 8 to 35 mm long, which can be stacked for greater extension.

Since extension tubes do not have optics, they do not affect the optical quality of a lens. Due to their function, there are other effects: decrease of light; shallower depth of field; and loss of ability to focus at infinity. The longer the extension tube, the closer the lens can focus. Correspondingly, the amount of light and depth of field will be reduced. On modern cameras using auto exposure the decrease in exposure is corrected for by the camera, but when not using auto exposure this has to be calculated and taken into account when setting exposure. The exposure compensation, called the bellows factor, is a dimensionless ratio that is applied to the relative aperture (f-number), resulting in the working f-number of the lens and extension tube combination.

The precise reduction of the amount of light reaching the imaging plane can be calculated using the inverse square law formula. For a lens whose entrance and exit pupils are the same size, the working f-number equals the marked f-number multiplied by (1 + m), where m is the magnification; at life-size (1:1) magnification a lens set to f/4 therefore behaves like about f/8, two stops slower.

Extension tubes without electrical contacts will not allow an electronic automatic camera to control the lens, thus disabling autofocus and in some cases forcing a user to shoot wide open unless the lens offers manual aperture control. More expensive extension tubes contain electrical contacts allowing the user to use autofocus and electronically control the aperture of the attached lens. An advantage to the non-electrical tubes is their lower price.

Other items like lens adapters may unintentionally have an effect similar to an extension tube. A lens designed for a small flange focal distance may not be able to focus to infinity when a lens adapter places the sensor too far away.

== Versus teleconverters and close-up lens ==
Extension tubes are sometimes confused with teleconverters, an optical component (i.e., containing lenses) designed to increase effective focal length.

A close-up lens also enables focusing closer for macro photography but, unlike an extension tube, a close-up lens actually is an optical element.

== See also ==
- Bellows (photography)
- Reversing ring
