= Secondary lens =

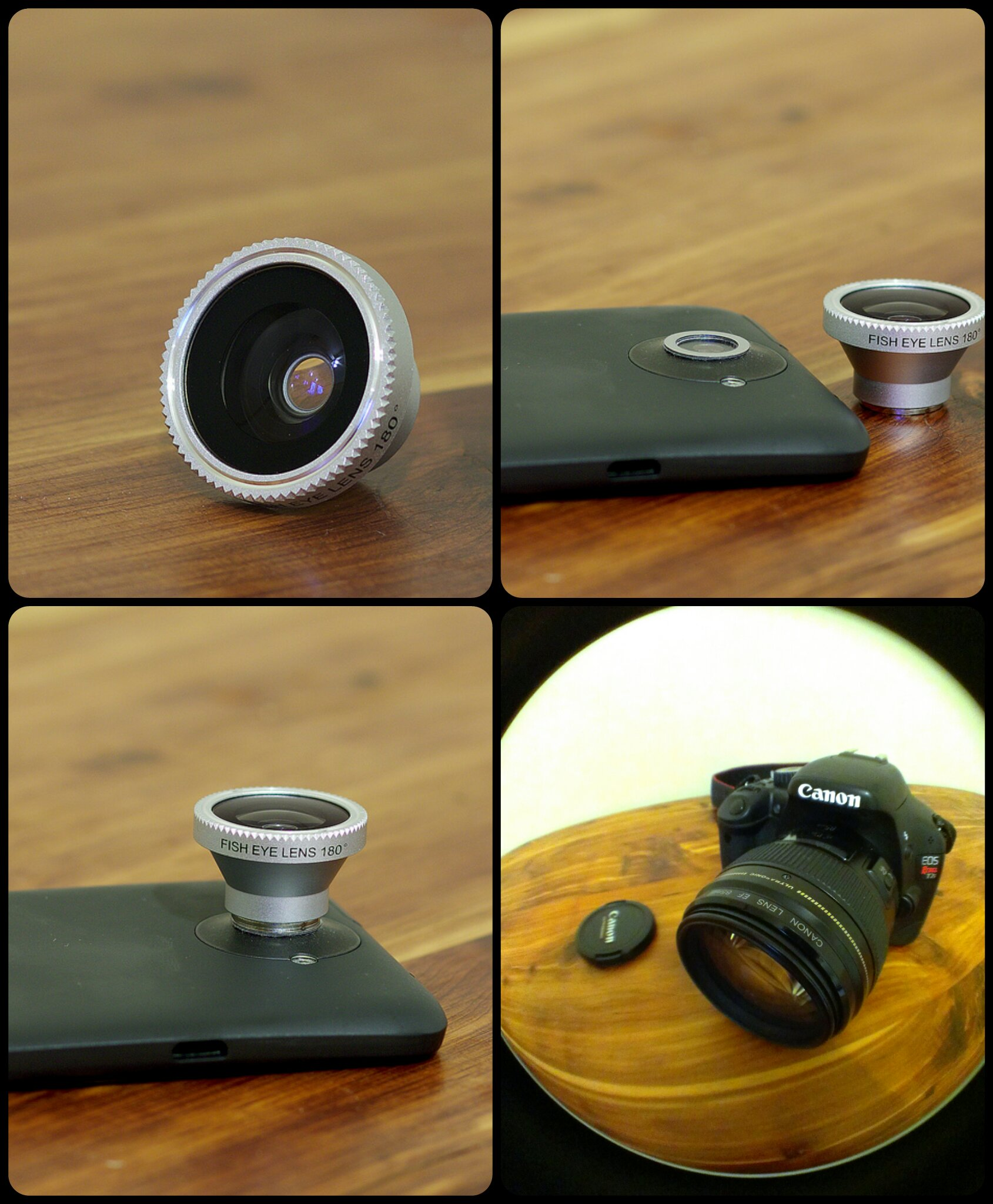
A fisheye secondary lens that attaches to a phone camera using a magnetic ring, with an example image using the lens

In photography, a secondary lens or accessory lens is a lens designed to be used in conjunction with another lens, called the primary lens.

A secondary lens may be designed to be used either in front of the primary lens, between it and the subject, or behind the primary lens, between it and the film.

Secondary lenses are typically simpler in mechanical design than other photographic lenses. Normally but not always there is no provision for control of focus or aperture, as these are achieved by the controls on the primary lens.

== Lenses used in front of the primary lens ==
Examples of secondary lenses designed to be used in front of the primary lens are:

- Fisheye adaptors
- Corrected wide angle adaptors
- Telephoto adaptors such as teleside converters
- Close-up lenses

All of these lens typically mount on the filter ring of the primary lens.

Front-mounting secondary lenses are commonly used to provide wide-angle and telephoto lenses for cameras which lack the facility to change the primary lens, such as consumer and "prosumer" video cameras and camcorders, bridge cameras, point-and-shoot cameras and some older consumer medium format cameras.

== Lenses used behind the primary lens ==
=== Teleconverters ===
The most common secondary lens used behind the primary lens is the teleconverter. A typical teleconverter has a male and a female lens mount of the same type, to allow it to be used between a primary lens and a camera body of the matching system. The resulting combination has a greater focal length than the primary lens alone, and the same absolute aperture, so its f-number is increased accordingly.

Some teleconverters are dedicated or matched to particular primary lenses, normally one or more lenses by the same manufacturer as the teleconvertor, and when used in this combination deliver quality comparable to the primary lens. Others are general-purpose, and in use typically offer less image quality than a primary lens of the same quality, but allow a camera kit to offer a wider variety of focal lengths with a smaller number of lenses, saving in both cost and weight.

It is not normally possible to construct a similar wide-angle adaptor, as the angle of view of the primary lens is matched to the film format for which is designed, and unwanted light is typically stopped by baffles. Any device similar to a teleconverter designed to use the primary lens for wider angles than those for which it is designed is therefore likely to cause vignetting. Focal reducers are an exception which take advantage of focal flange difference between camera systems.

=== Cross-system adaptors ===
Specialised secondary lenses may be used behind the primary lens to adapt a lens of one camera system and/or film format to another. These are called active adaptors or converters. For example, a Pentax screw mount lens cannot normally be mounted on a Nikon F-mount camera, as the Nikon bayonet mount is further from the film plane than the Pentax screw mount, leaving no room for a mount adaptor. However active adaptors are available containing a (not very powerful) teleconverter, which makes the combination mechanically possible, albeit with a small amount of cropping at the image edges and loss of connection of the camera to any lens automation.

The optical components of these adaptors may reduce or increase the focal length of the combination, or they may affect only the back focal distance of the combination, leaving the effective focal length for purposes of photographic composition unchanged.

== See also ==
- Barlow lens
- Convertible lens
- Objective (optics)
