= Close-up lens =

Secondary lens used to enable macro photography

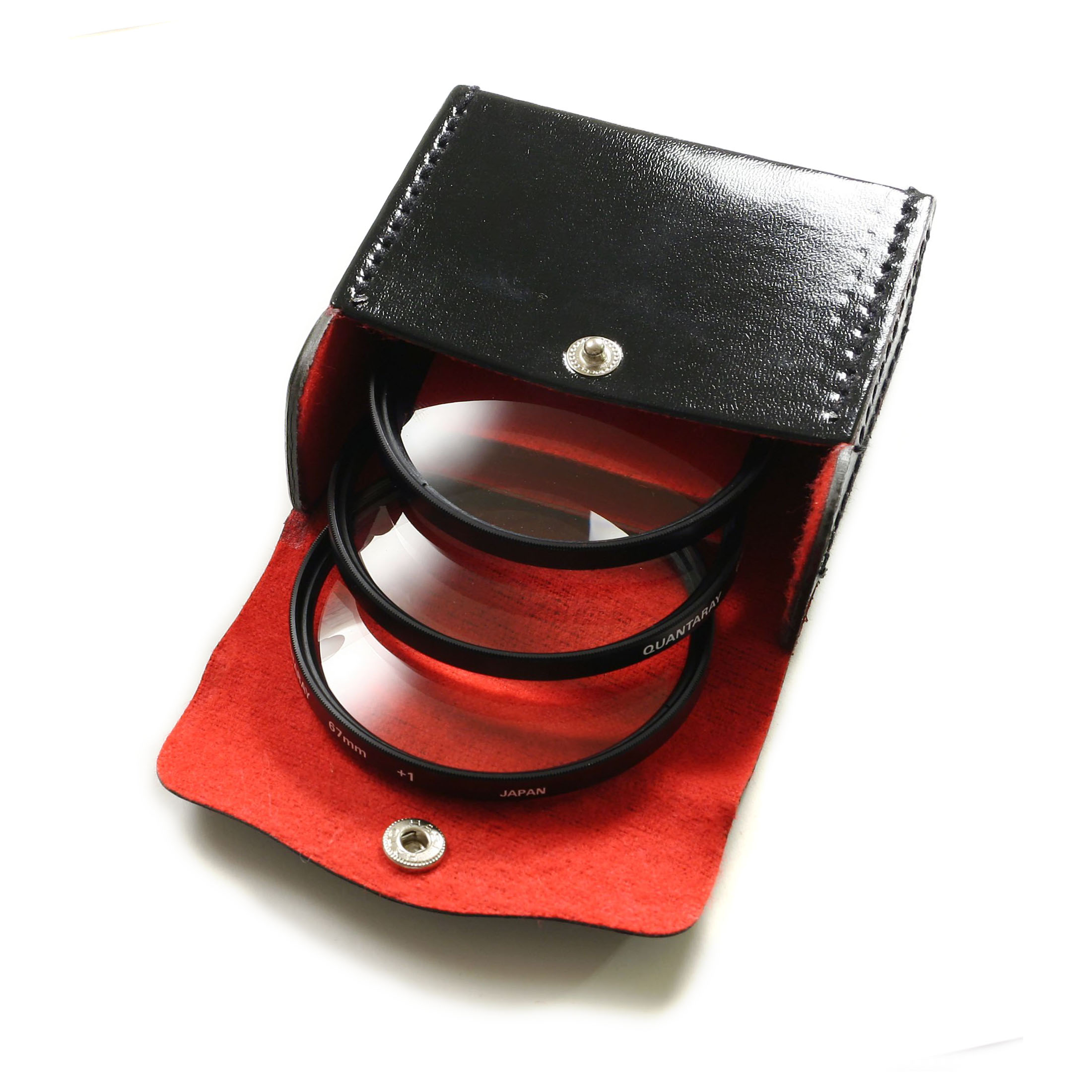
Set of three close-up lenses

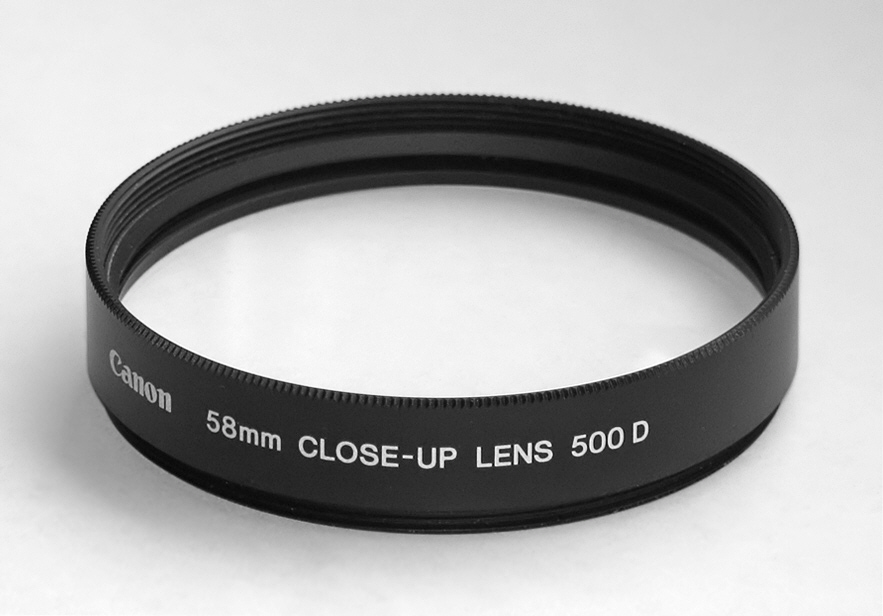
Typical close-up lens

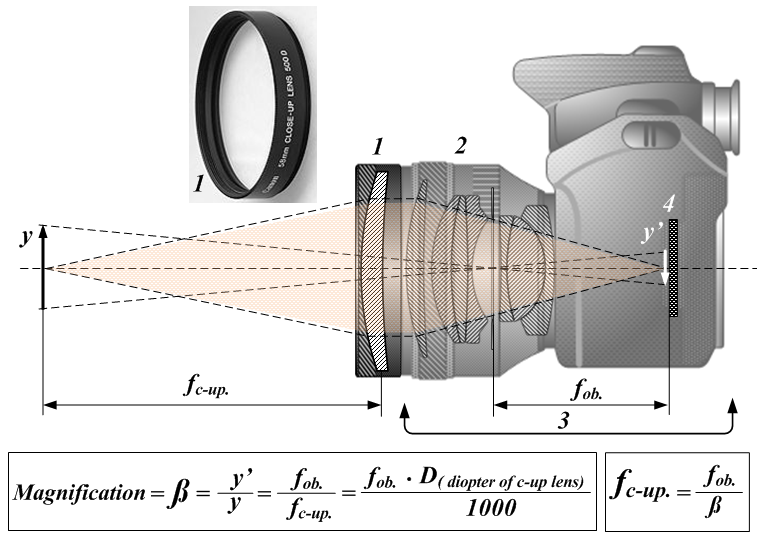
Optical scheme of close-up photography.: 1 - Close-up lens.; 2 - Camera objective lens (set to infinity).; 3 - Camera.; 4 - Film or CCD plane.; y - Object; y" - Image

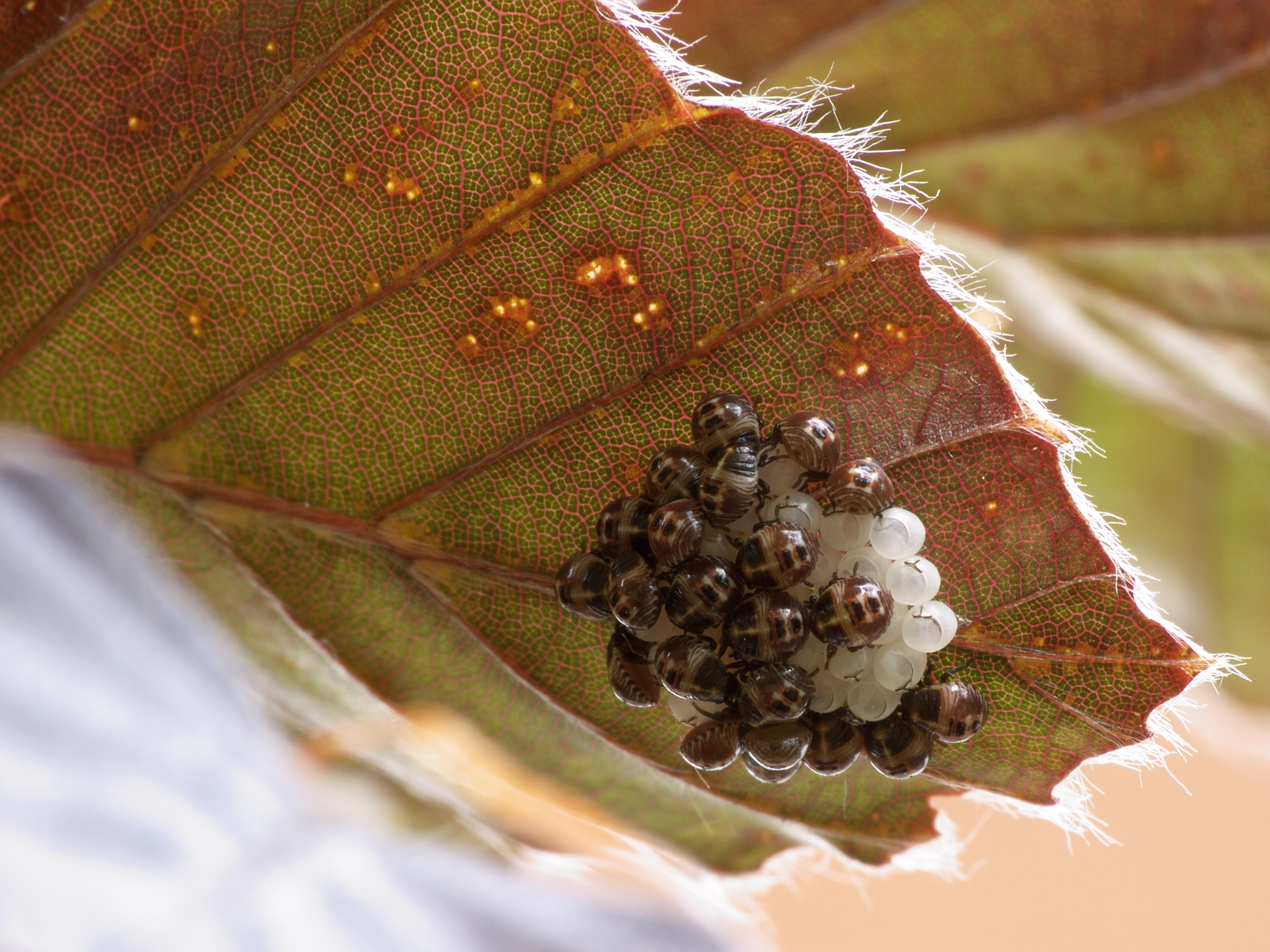
Photograph taken with a 3 diopter achromatic close-up lens: Pentatomidae-hatchlings underneath a purple beech leaf

In photography, a close-up lens (sometimes referred to as close-up filter or a macro filter) is a simple secondary lens used to enable macro photography without requiring a specialised primary lens. They work like reading glasses, allowing a primary lens to focus more closely. Bringing the focus closer allows the photographer more possibilities.

Close-up lenses typically mount on the filter thread of the primary lens, and are often manufactured and sold by suppliers of photographic filters. Nonetheless, they are lenses and not filters. Some manufacturers refer to their close-up lenses as diopters, after the unit of measurement of their optical power.

Close-up lenses do not affect exposure, unlike extension tubes, which also can be used for macro photography with a non-macro lens.

== Optical power ==
Close-up lenses are often specified by their optical power in diopters, the reciprocal of the focal length in meters. For a close-up lens, the diopter value is positive: the bigger the number, the greater the effective magnification.

Higher quality achromatic lenses commonly lack a strength specification in diopters. It can be inferred as the reciprocal of the maximum specified working distance in meters (i.e., a lens with a maximum working distance of 25 cm has a strength of +4 diopters).

Several close-up lenses may be used in combination; the optical power of the combination is the sum of the optical powers of the component lenses. For example, a set of lenses of +1, +2, and +4 diopters can be combined to provide a range from +1 to +7 in steps of 1.

== Working distances and magnifications ==
Close-up lenses change both the maximum and minimum focus distances of a lens. The range can be rather small.

=== Working at maximum distance ===
Adding a close-up lens to a lens focused to infinity changes the focus point to the focal length of the close-up lens, that is, the inverse of its optical power. This is the combination's maximal working distance:

$X_\text{max} = \frac{1}{D}$

That distance is sometimes given on the filter in millimeters. A +3 close-up lens has a maximal working distance of 0.333 m or 333 mm.

The magnification is the focal distance of the objective lens (f) divided by the focal distance of the close-up lens; i.e., the focal distance of the objective lens (in meters) multiplied by the diopter value (D) of the close-up lens:

$M_{X\text{max}} = f D$

In the example above, if the lens has a 300 mm focal distance, the magnification is 0.3 × 3 = 0.9.

Given the small size of most sensors (about 25 mm for APS-C sensors) a 20 mm insect will almost fill the frame at this magnification. Using a zoom lens makes it easy to frame the subject as desired.

=== Working at minimal distance ===
When you add a close-up lens to a camera which is focusing at the shortest distance at which the objective lens can focus, the focus will move to a distance which is given by following formula:

$X_\text{min} = \frac{X}{D X + 1}$

X being the shortest distance at which the objective lens can focus (in meters), and D being the diopter value of the close-up lens. This is the minimal working distance at which you will be able to take a picture with the close-up lens.

For example, a lens that can focus at 1.5 m combined with a +3 diopter close-up lens will give a closest working distance of 1.5 / (3 × 1.5 + 1) = 0.273 m.

The magnification reached in those conditions is given by following formula:

$M_{X\text{min}} = M_X (D X + 1)$

M_{X} being the magnification at distance X without the close-up lens.

In the example above, the gain of magnification at X_{min} will be (3 × 1.5 + 1) = 5.5.

While it would seem obvious that at this X_{min} distance you will get the highest magnification, focus breathing can cause more of a difference in actual magnification than the small overall in-focus working distance range particularly for higher strength diopters.

== Macro photography with a close-up lens ==
Close-up lenses can make a telephoto lens function as a macro lens with a large working distance. This is useful, for example, to prevent scaring small animals or isolating the subject from messy surroundings. To use the filters for animals the size of the animal will determine the working distance (small snakes 1 m to 50 cm, lizards 50–25 cm, small butterflies, beetles 25–10 cm), so it is essential to know what will be the favorite subject before screwing on a close-up lens. The close-up lenses are most effective with long focal length objectives and using a zoom lens is very practical to have some flexibility in the magnification. A good technique for sharp focussing is to take a picture at a long focal length first to have optimal sharpness at the essential details and then zooming out to have the desired size in the frame.

== Optical issues ==
Some single-element close-up lenses produce images with severe aberrations but there are also high-quality close-up lenses composed as achromatic doublets which are capable of producing excellent images, with fairly low loss of sharpness.

== See also ==
- Deep focus
- Extension tube
- Photographic filter#Close-up and split diopter lenses
