= Barlow lens =

Optical lens used to increase focal length

Cone of light behind an achromatic doublet objective lens (A) without (red) and with (green) a Barlow lens optical element (B)

The Barlow lens, named after the English physicist and mathematician Peter Barlow (1776–1862), is an optical tube with diverging lens elements that, used in series with other optics in an optical system, increase the effective focal length of an optical system as perceived by all components that are after it in the system. The practical result is that inserting a Barlow lens magnifies the image. A real Barlow lens is usually not a single glass element, because that would generate chromatic aberration, and spherical aberration if the lens is not aspheric. More common configurations use three or more elements for achromatic correction or apochromatic correction and higher image quality.

== Telescope use ==
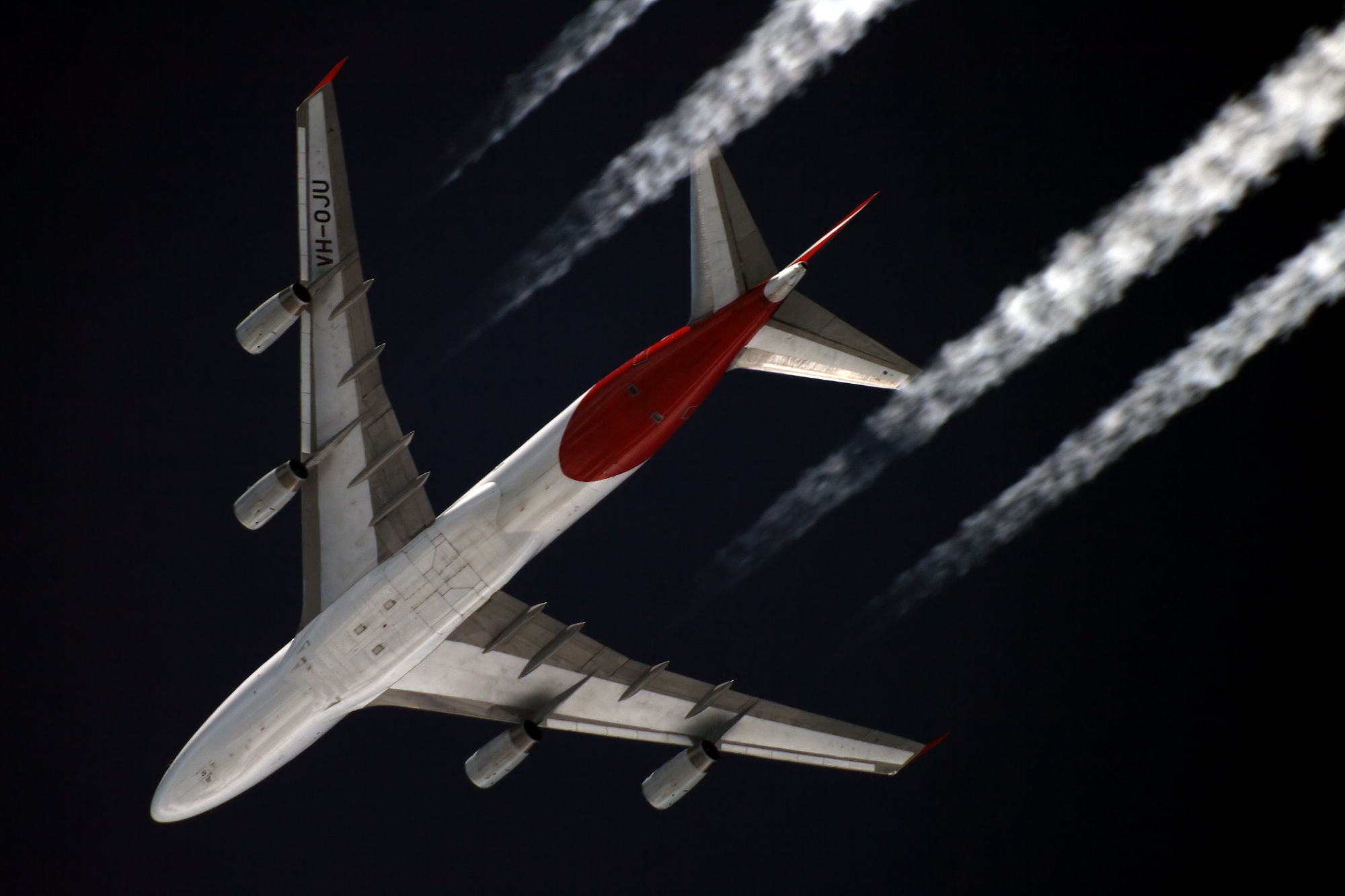
A Boeing 747-400 aircraft at 11,000 metres, photographed from the ground using a 1,200 mm telescope and a 2x Barlow lens.

In its astronomical use, a Barlow lens may be placed immediately before an eyepiece to effectively decrease the eyepiece's focal length by the amount of the Barlow's divergence. Since the magnification provided by a telescope and eyepiece is equal to the telescope's focal length divided by the eyepiece's focal length, this has the effect of increasing the magnification of the image.

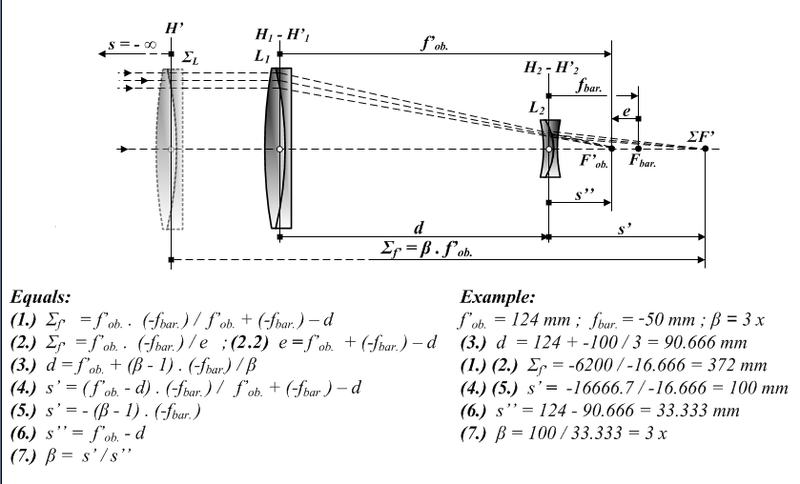
Barlow diagram

Astronomical Barlow lenses are rated for the amount of magnification they induce. Most commonly, Barlow lenses are 2x or 3x, but adjustable Barlows are also available. The power of an adjustable Barlow lens is changed by adding an extension tube between the Barlow and the eyepiece to increase the magnification.

The amount of magnification is one more than the distance between the Barlow lens and the eyepiece lens, when the distance is measured in units of the focal length of the Barlow lens. A standard Barlow lens is housed in a tube that is one Barlow focal-length long, so that a focusing lens inserted into the end of the tube will be separated from the Barlow lens at the other end by one Barlow focal-length, and hence produce a 2x magnification over and above what the eyepiece would have produced alone. If the length of a standard 2x Barlow lens' tube is doubled, then the lenses are separated by two Barlow focal lengths and it becomes a 3x Barlow. Similarly, if the tube length is tripled, then the lenses are separated by three Barlow focal lengths and it becomes a 4x Barlow, and so on.

A common misconception is that higher magnification always equates to a higher-quality image. However, the quality of the image is in practice generally limited by the quality of the optics (lenses) or by the atmospheric viewing conditions, not by magnification.

Barlow lenses have the drawbacks of dimming the image, reducing sharpness, adding weight to the telescope potentially making it less stable, reducing the field of view up to the point of potentially vignetting, and possibly introducing or worsening chromatic aberration. Whether these issues affect the quality of observation is highly dependent on individual circumstances. Higher quality Barlows are built to minimize aberration.

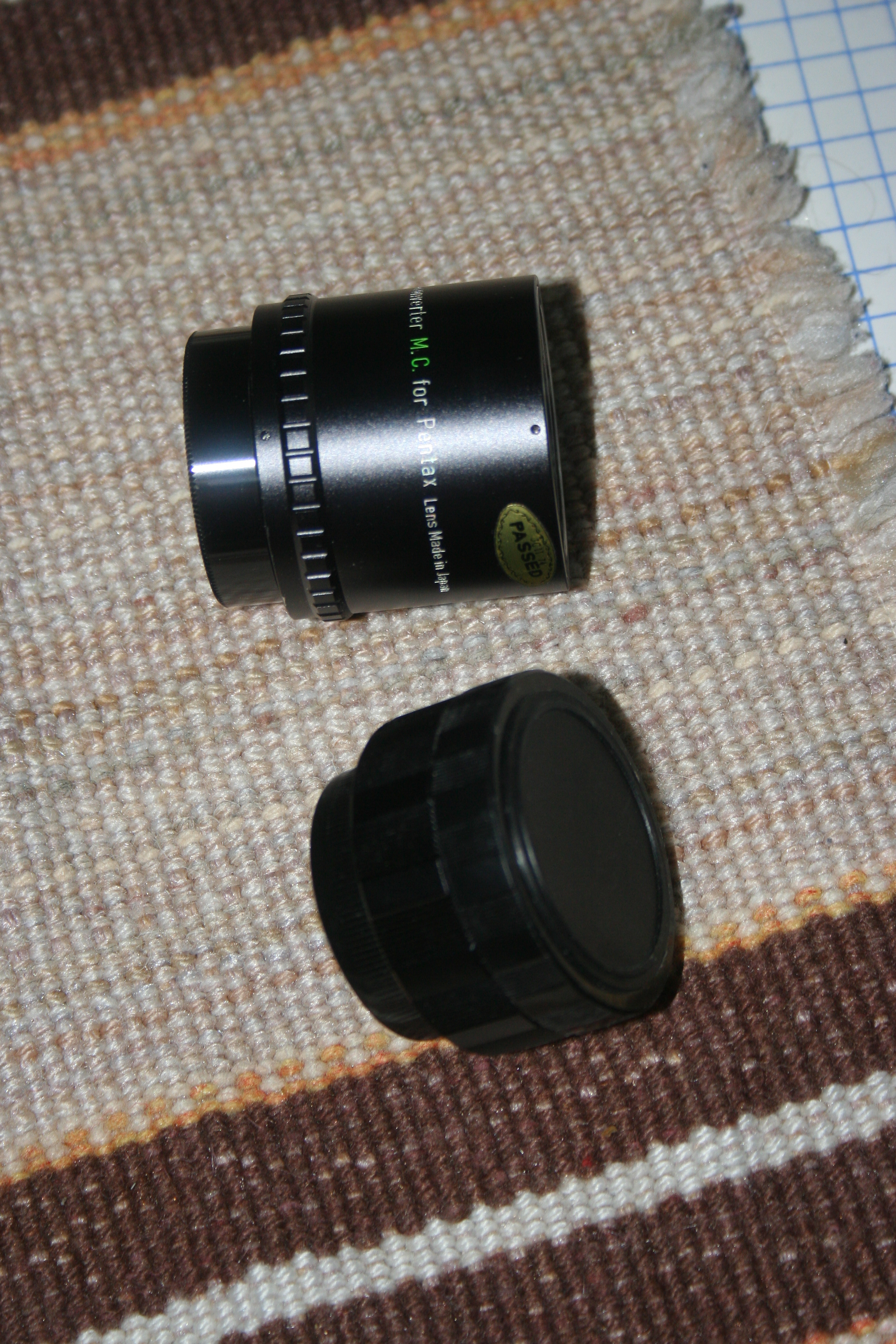
2x and 3x Barlow lenses for use in photography circa 2010

== Photography use ==
Teleconverters are variations on Barlow lenses that have been adapted for photographic use. A teleconverter increases the effective focal length of the photographic lens it is attached to, making it a telephoto lens. A true telephoto lens uses a configuration similar to a Barlow lens to obtain a shorter tube length for a given focal length.

== Microscope use ==
In microscopy the Barlow lens is used to increase working distance and decrease magnification. The lenses are "objective lenses" that are mounted in front of the microscope's last objective element. Barlow lenses for microscopes can be found with magnifications ranging from 0.3× to 2×. Some standard lenses are 2×, which decreases the working distance by half and doubles the magnification, 0.75× (3/4×), which increases the working distance by 4/3× (1.33×) and decreases the magnification by 0.75×, and a 0.5× Barlow doubles the working distance and halves the magnification.

== See also ==
- Secondary lens
- Teleconverter
