= Teleside converter =

Device mounted in front of a lens

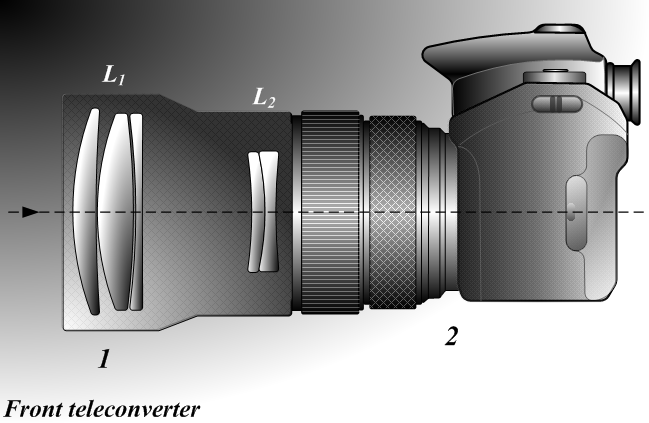
A teleside converter lens attached in front of a camera. 2 - Camera lens 1 - Teleside converter

A teleside converter (also known as a telephoto conversion lens or a front mount teleconverter) is a secondary lens which is mounted on the front of a photographic lens to increase the effective focal length of the lens they are attached to. They are used on cameras and video cameras with non–interchangeable lenses to increase the magnification of the image. Their design is usually that of an afocal Galilean telescope that alters the width of the entering beam of light without affecting the divergence of the beam, so they can change the effective focal length 1 to 3 times without increasing focal ratio. The down side to teleside converters is they will vignette the image on the wide angle setting if used on a zoom lens. Minimum focal length without vignetting will increase inline with higher power of the teleside converter. Before vignetting appears, light fall-off will appear first and in general shooting this light fall-off may not be noticeable. The other concern is minimum working distance, so the teleside converter cannot be used below minimum working distance and it depends on both the camera and the teleside converter being used.

These types of lenses are used on cameras which lack the facility to change the primary lens and therefore cannot accept a standard rear mount teleconverter, such as consumer and "prosumer" video cameras and camcorders, bridge cameras, point-and-shoot cameras and some older consumer medium format cameras. Some camera models have specifically designed teleside converters. Since teleside converters are afocal they can be mounted universally on almost any camera lens via adapter rings designed to fit the filter ring of the camera's primary lens.

== See also ==
- Secondary lens
- Teleconverter
- Convertible lens
