= Afocal system =

Optical system that produces no net convergence or divergence of the beam

Diagram of the light path in an afocal system

In optics, an afocal system (a system without focus) is an optical system that produces no net convergence or divergence of the beam, i.e., has an infinite effective focal length. This type of system can be created with a pair of optical elements where the physical distance d between the elements is equal to the sum of each element's focal length f_{i} (d = f_{1}+f_{2}). A simple example of an afocal optical system is an optical telescope imaging a star, the light entering the system is from the star at infinity (to the left) and the image it forms is at infinity (to the right), i.e., the collimated light is collimated by the afocal system. Although the system does not alter the divergence of a collimated beam, it does alter the width of the beam, increasing magnification. The magnification of such a telescope is given by

$$M = \frac{f_2}{f_1},$$

Afocal systems are used in laser optics, for instance as beam expanders, Infrared and forward looking infrared systems, camera zoom lenses and telescopic lens attachments such as teleside converters, and photography setups combining cameras and telescopes (Afocal photography).

== See also ==
- Lens (optics)
- Teleside converter
- Galilean telescope, which uses this design
