= Telephoto lens =

Type of camera lens with long focal length

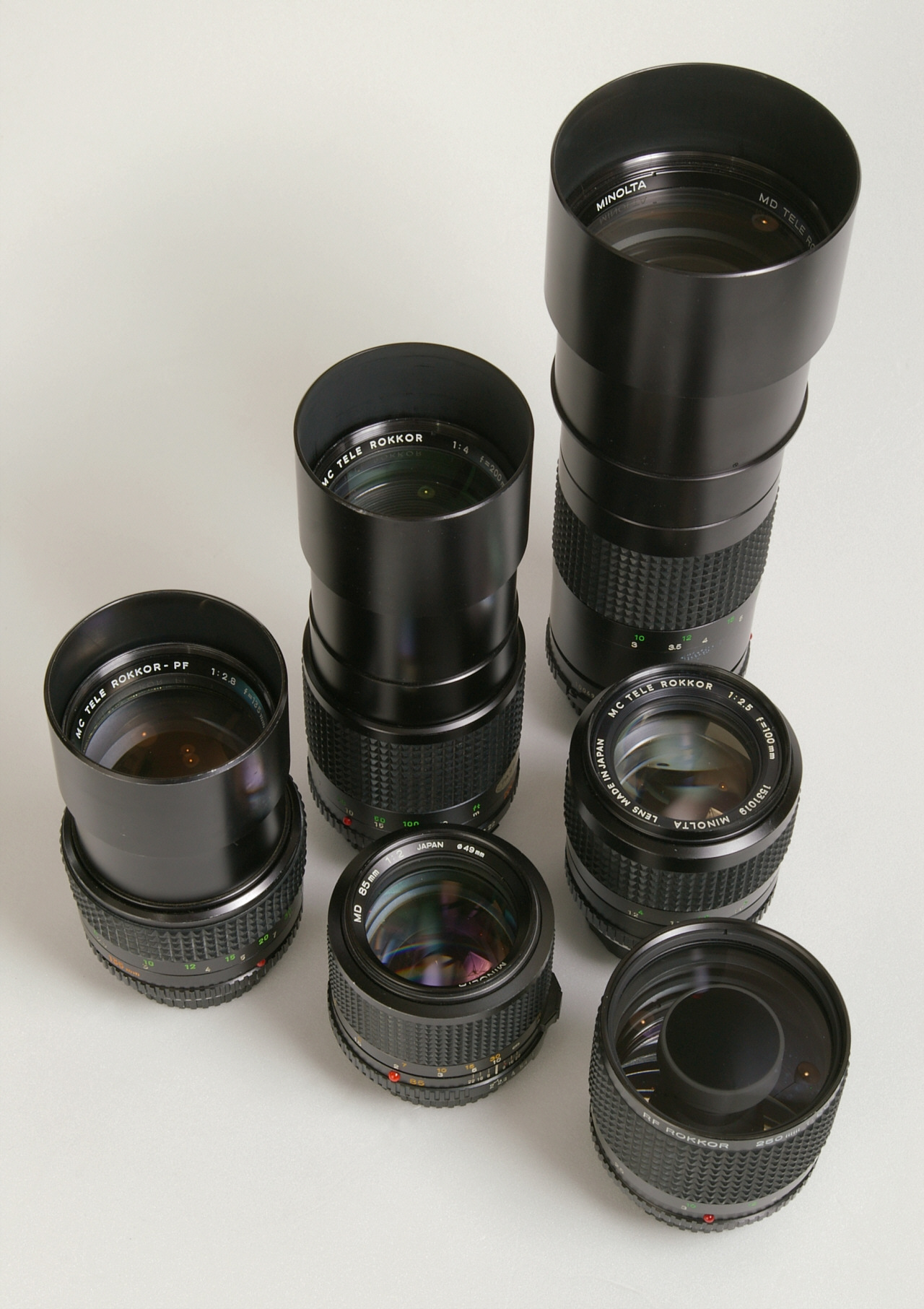
A collection of telephoto lenses

A telephoto lens, also known as telelens, is a specific type of a long-focus lens used in photography and cinematography, in which the physical length of the lens is shorter than the focal length. This is achieved by incorporating a special lens group known as a telephoto group that extends the light path to create a long-focus lens in a much shorter overall design. The angle of view and other effects of long-focus lenses are the same for telephoto lenses of identical specified focal length. Long-focal-length lenses are often informally referred to as telephoto lenses, although this is technically incorrect: a telephoto lens specifically incorporates the telephoto group.

== Construction ==
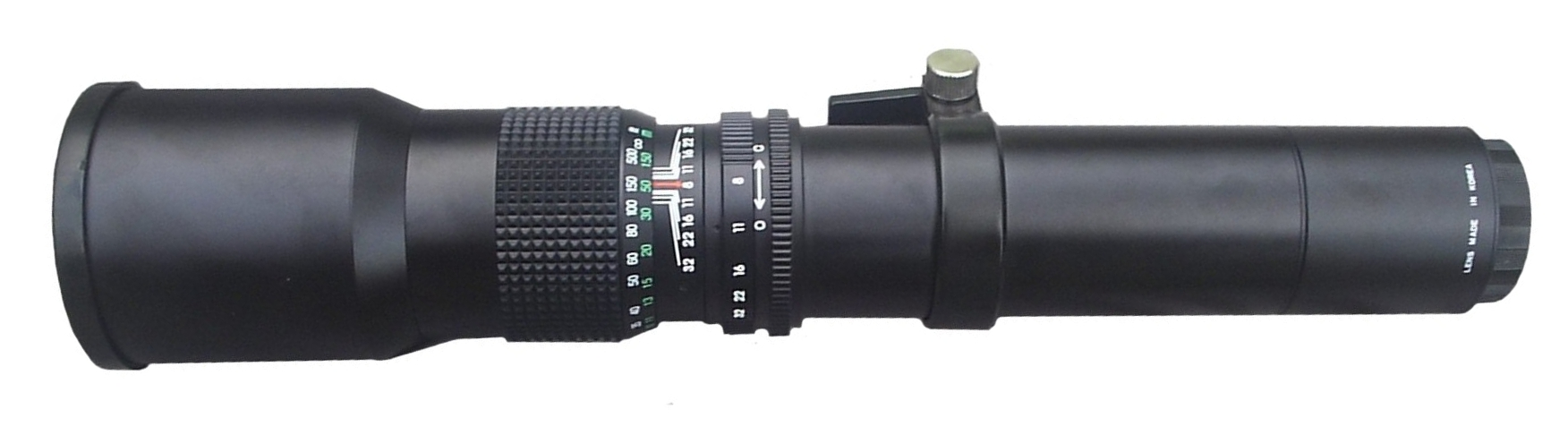
A 500 mm telephoto lens with extension tube.

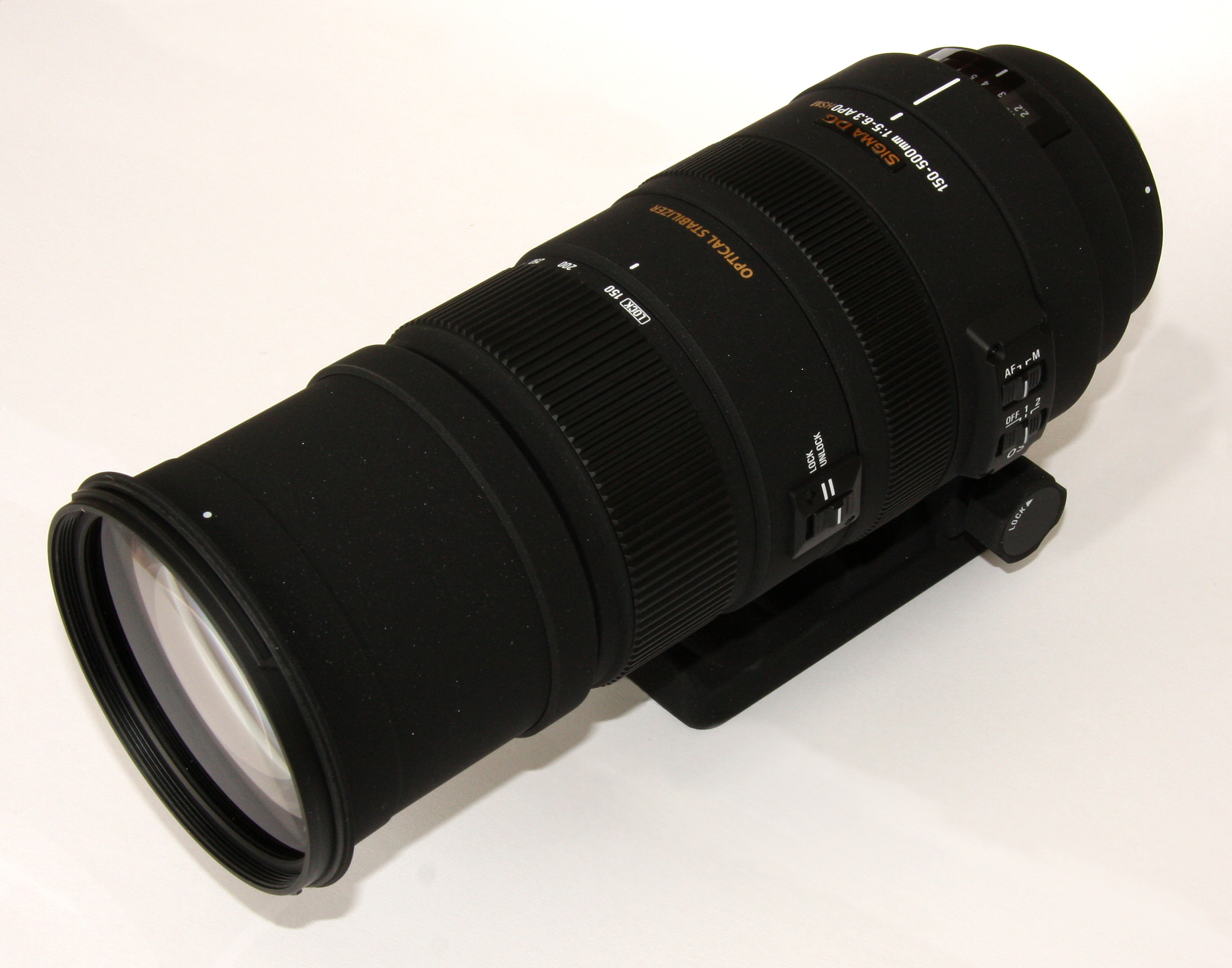
A 150–500 mm telephoto zoom lens, physically much shorter than its maximum focal length.

A simple photographic lens may be constructed using one lens element of a given focal length. To focus on an object at infinity, the distance from this single lens to focal plane of the camera (where the sensor or film is) must be adjusted to the focal length of that lens. For example, given a focal length of 500 mm, the distance between lens and focal plane is 500 mm. The further the focal length is increased, the more the physical length of such a simple lens makes it unwieldy. In practice, to minimize optical aberrations, instead of a single lens element, these simple lenses are typically constructed using several elements to form an achromatic lens.

However, such simple lenses are not telephoto lenses, no matter how extreme the focal length – they are known as long-focus lenses. While the optical centre of a simple ("non-telephoto") lens is within the construction, the telephoto lens moves the optical centre in front of the construction. In other words, a telephoto lens may have a focal length of 400 mm even though it is shorter than that. While the length of a long-focus lens approximates its focal length, a telephoto lens manages to be shorter than its focal length. The term telephoto ratio refers to the physical length of a lens divided by its focal length; where long-focus lenses have a telephoto ratio around 1, telephoto lenses have a ratio less than 1. As an example, one modern lens (Canon EF 400 mm f/4 DO IS) achieves a telephoto ratio of 0.58 in part due to a front (converging) lens group which incorporates diffractive optics.

Diagram of a typical telephoto lens with a large positive lens and a smaller negative telephoto group combined to create a much longer focal length - f.

The simplest telephoto lens can be regarded as having two elements: one (on the object side) converging and another (on the image side) diverging. Again, in practice, more than one element is used in each group to correct for various aberrations. The combination of these two groups produces a lens assembly that is physically shorter than a long-focus lens producing the same image size.

As a group, the front (object-facing) elements in a telephoto lens collectively have a positive focus, with an overall focal length that is shorter than the effective focal length of the lens. The converging rays from this group are intercepted by the rear (image-facing) lens group, sometimes called the "telephoto group", which has a negative focus. This second group of elements spread the cone of light so that it appears to have come from a lens of much greater focal length.

Diagram of a catadioptric mirrors lens.

This same property is achieved in camera lenses that combine mirrors with lenses. These designs, called catadioptric, 'reflex', or 'mirror' lenses, have a curved mirror as the primary objective with some form of negative lens in front of the mirror to correct optical aberrations. They also use a curved secondary mirror to relay the image that extends the light cone the same way the negative lens telephoto group does. The mirrors also fold the light path. This makes them much shorter, lighter, and cheaper than an all refractive lens, but some optical compromises, primarily the "doughnut" shape of out-of-focus highlights, are caused by the central obstruction from the secondary mirror.

The heaviest non-Catadioptric telephoto lens for civilian use was made by Carl Zeiss and has a focal length of 1700 mm with a maximum aperture of f/4, implying a 425 mm (16.7 in) entrance pupil. It is designed for use with a medium format Hasselblad 203 FE camera and weighs 256 kg (564 lb).

The telephoto lens design has also been used for wide angles. In the case of the Olympus XA, the telephoto arrangement permitted a 35 mm focal length to fit in an extra compact camera body.

=== Retrofocus lenses ===
A diagram of light travel through a wide-angle lens showing how focal length can be shorter than the lens.

Inverting the telephoto configuration, employing one or more negative lens groups in front of a positive lens group, creates a wide-angle lens with an increased back focal distance. These are called retrofocus lenses or inverted telephotos, which have greater clearance from the rear element to the film plane than their focal length would permit with a conventional wide-angle lens optical design. This allows for greater clearance for other optical or mechanical parts such as the mirror parts in a single-lens reflex camera.

Zoom lenses that are telephotos at one extreme of the zoom range and retrofocus at the other are now common.

== Naming ==
Telephoto lenses are sometimes divided into the further sub-types of short or portrait (85–135 mm in 35 mm film format), medium (135–300 mm in 35 mm film format) and super (over 300 mm in 35 mm film format).

Typical telephoto lens focal lengths (mm) for different formats
Angle of view (diag.) Sensor size (format)	34–18°	18–8°	8–1°
Naming convention:	Short / Portrait	Medium	Super
1"	25.5–49.5	49.5–110	110–734.5
4/3	35–65	65–150	150–1000
APS-C	45–90	90–195	195–1310
35 mm	70–135	135–300	300–2000
6×6 (120 film)	130–250	250–550	550–3660
4×5 (large format)	550–1000	1000–2250	2250–15000

== History ==
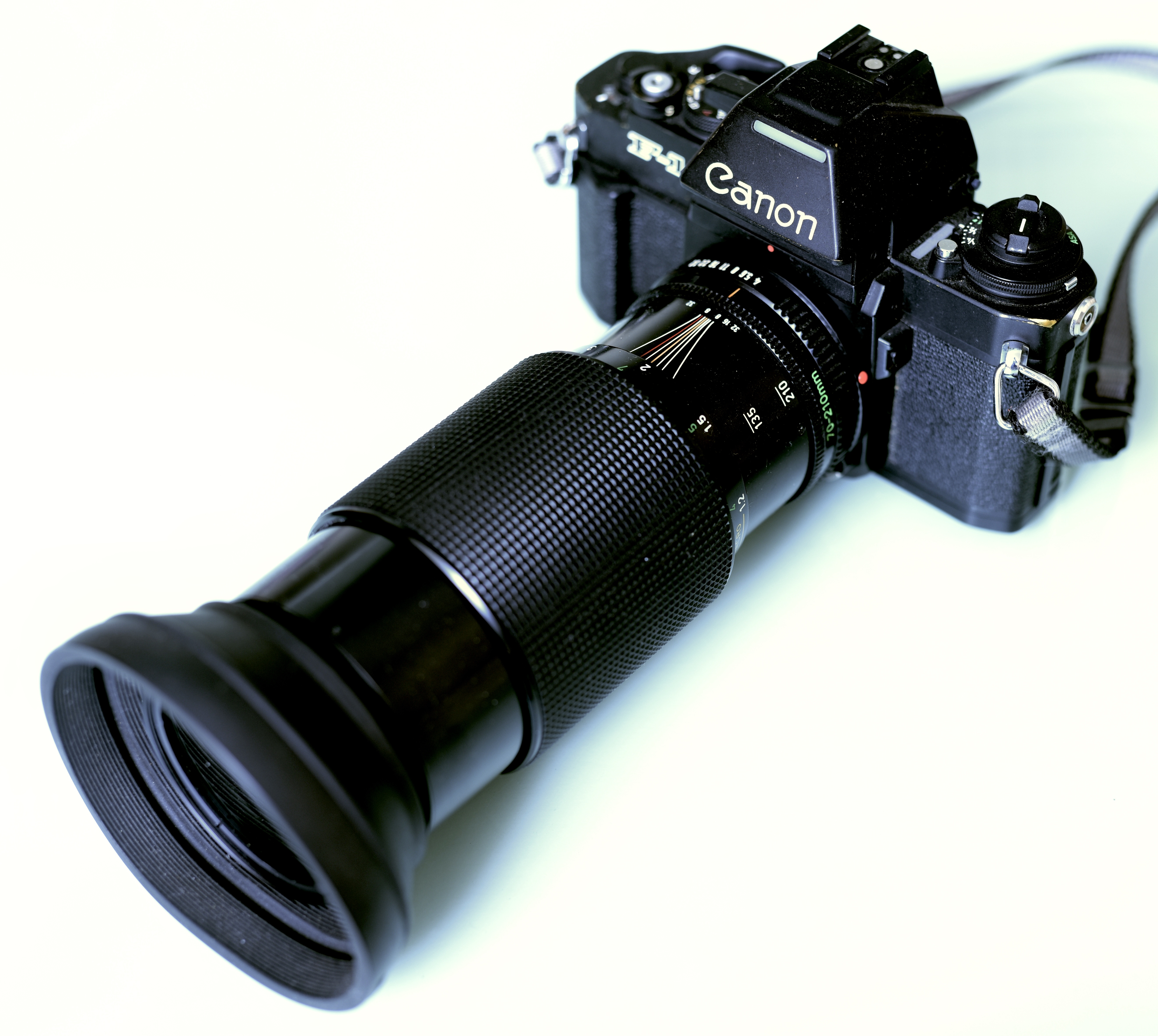
A Canon New F-1 (1981), a 35 mm camera with a telephoto zoom lens with 70-210 mm focal length.

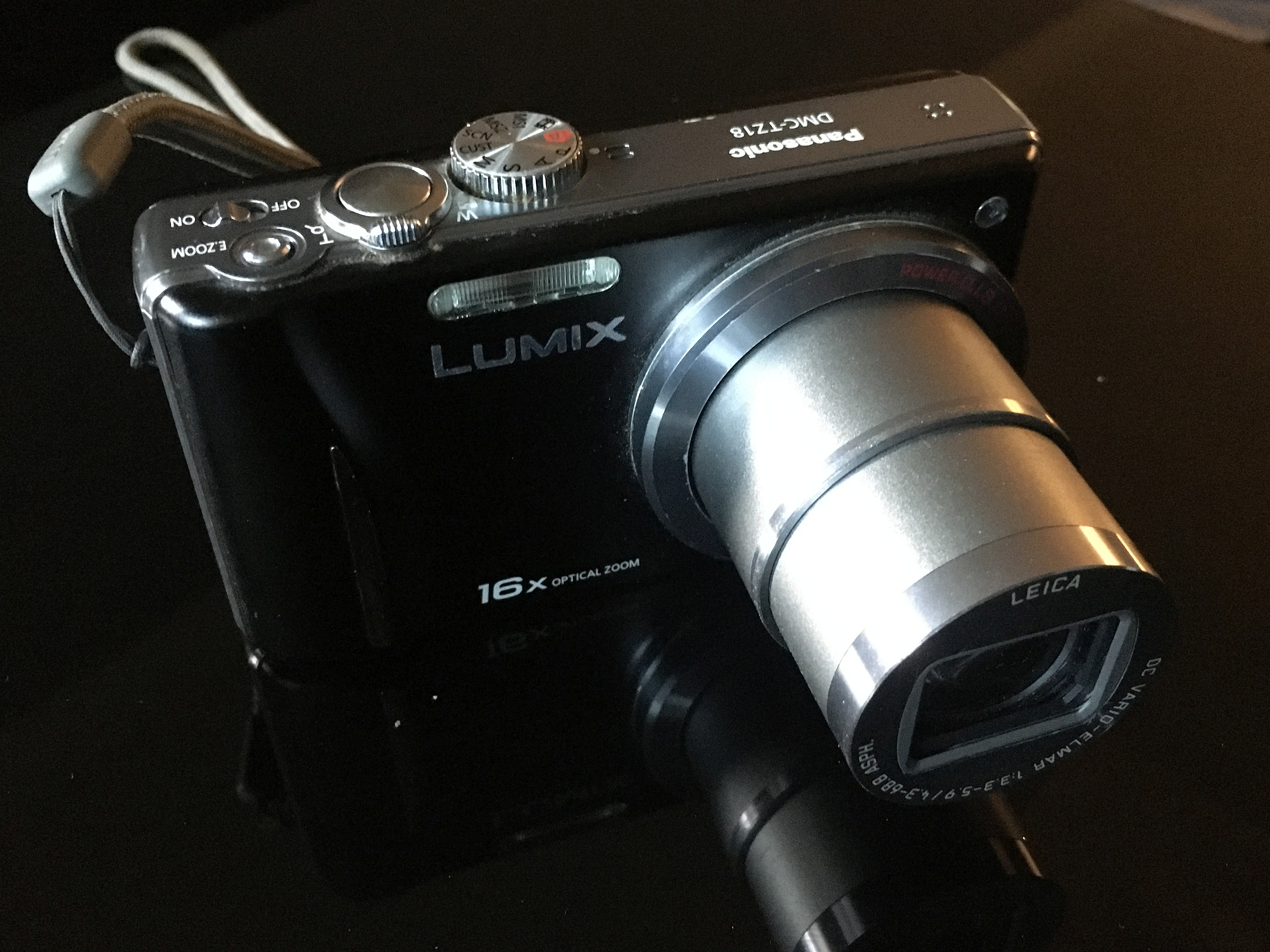
Some compact digital cameras like the Panasonic Lumix DMC-TZ18 (2010) have superzoom lenses with a large range of focal lengths. The lens is completely stored inside the camera in switched-off state and has a maximum focal length (shown) of 384 mm (calculated equivalent to 35 mm film), minimum is 24 mm, a zoom factor of 16×.

The concept of the telephoto lens, in reflecting form, was first described by Johannes Kepler in his Dioptrice of 1611, and re-invented by Peter Barlow in 1834.

Histories of photography usually credit Thomas Rudolphus Dallmeyer with the invention of the photographic telephoto lens in 1891, though it was independently invented by others about the same time. Some credit his father John Henry Dallmeyer in 1860.

In 1883 or 1884, New Zealand photographer Alexander McKay discovered he could create a much more manageable long-focus lens by combining a shorter focal length telescope objective lens with negative lenses and other optical parts from opera glasses to modify the light cone. Some of his photographs are preserved in the holdings of the Turnbull Library in Wellington, and two of these can be unequivocally dated as having been taken during May 1886. One of McKay's photographs shows a warship anchored in Wellington harbour about two and a half kilometres away, with its rigging lines and gun ports clearly visible. The other, taken from the same point, is of a local hotel, the Shepherds Arms, about 100 metres distant from the camera. The masts of the ship are visible in the background. McKay's other photographic achievements include photo-micrographs, and a ‘shadow-less technique’ for photographing fossils.

McKay presented his work to the Wellington Philosophical Society (the precursor of the Royal Society of New Zealand) in 1890.

Starting in the mid-1970s, Japanese manufacturers introduced telephoto lenses which focused by moving the smaller (diverging) rear group, rather than moving the entire optical system as a unit. In some cases, a second converging group was added behind the diverging group. This was marketed as internal focusing, differential focusing, or rear focusing and the concept was derived from zoom lens designs.

== See also ==
- Afocal photography
- Film format
- Secret photography
- Photographic lens design
- Barlow lens
- Zoom lens
- Telephoto compression
