= Enriqueta González Rubín =

Spanish writer (1832–1877)

- Born: 17 April 1832; Santianes, Ribadesella, Asturias, Spain
- Died: 9 November 1877 (aged 45); Infiesto, Asturias, Spain
- Occupation: Writer

Enriqueta González Rubín (17 April 1832 – 9 November 1877) was a Spanish writer. Her 1875 Viaxe del tío Pacho el Sordo a Uviedo is the earliest known novel published in Asturian.

== Biography ==
Relatively little is known about González Rubín's life. She was born on 17 April 1832 in Santianes, Ribadesella, Asturias. into a relatively wealthy family. Her parents were Bernardo González de Soto, a retired navy officer originally from Galicia, and Josefa Rubín González. Her mother died when González Rubín was young.

She became a single mother out of wedlock aged 22, however her son died a few months later. Five years later, on June 22^{nd} 1859, she married Juan Echevarría Barrera, with whom she went on to have 8 children. Despite becoming a mother, she stayed active in the Asturias community and continued her literary work throughout her life. As Enriqueta was an active part of her community, this enriched her literature and later resulted in her publishing the first novel written in Asturian. Through this we can see that Enriqueta was extremely important in promoting Asturian as a minority language, and that she helped this language reach a wider audience through her writing.

González Ruben died in on 9 November 1877 from cancer in Infiesto, Piloña, Asturias, aged 55.

== Literary Works ==
=== Viaxe del tío Pacho el Sordo a Uviedo ===
González Rubín's work Viaxe del tío Pacho el Sordo a Uviedo (Uncle Pacho the Deaf's Trip to Oviedo) was published in 1875; it is the earliest known published novel (and earliest known separately published narrative work) in Asturian. In it she ironically reflected on Asturian politics and society of this time.

In 2007, 133 years after its publication, the municipal heritage conservator of Llanes, José Antonio Anca, discovered this novel in a mansion in Llanes.

The discovery allowed us to know that it consists of a total of twenty-four octavo pages with a simple plot: the main character's journey to Oviedo to deliver a salmon to a person of whom he has only vague clues. Thus, Pacho gets to know some places in the city and faces several situations until he finds the person he was looking for, to return the next day to Ribadesella. The story allows González Rubín to discuss the people of Oviedo and to critique the politics and economy of the time.

=== El Faro Asturiano ===
Many of González Rubín's articles, poems and stories were published in the newspaper El Faro Asturiano, as well as a serialized novel. Her articles express a concern for women's living conditions, education, and role in society. In 1890, Protasio González Solís, the paper's director, published several works that González Rubín had written for the paper in his Memorias Asturianas (OCLC 892238758) using the pseudonyms "La Gallina Vieja" (The Old Hen), "La Cantora del Sella" (The [Female] Singer from Sella), and "Una Aldeana del Sella" (A [Female] Villager from Sella).

== Legacy ==
González Rubín’s legacy is kept alive through the Enriqueta González Rubín Journalism Award, which is one of the most prestigious awards for journalism in Asturias. Since 2003, it has been organized by the Ministry of Culture of Asturias.

During the week of May 4 to 8, 2009, the 30th Week of Asturian Letters was celebrated, dedicated to the memory of Enriqueta. The Government of Asturias reissued and revived her work, complementing it with literary studies on her legacy.

There currently exists a “Enriqueta González Rubín” route in Santianes, promoted by “La Sociedad Etnográfica de Ribadesella” (The Ribadesella Etnographic Society). The route is inspired by a journey described by the writer in her story “Una excursión a la montaña” (A Trip up the Mountain) published in “El Faro Asturiano”.

In her hometown of Santianes del Agua there is a plaque in her honour, and the town square was given her name.
