= Menchu Álvarez del Valle =

Spanish radio journalist (1928–2021)

- Born: María del Carmen Álvarez del Valle; 16 January 1928; Santander, Spain
- Died: 27 July 2021 (aged 93); Ribadesella, Spain
- Occupation: Journalist
- Years active: 1947–1990
- Spouse: José Luis Ortiz Velasco (m. 1949; died 2005)
- Children: 3
- Relatives: Letizia, Queen of Spain (granddaughter)
- Awards: Antena de Oro (1974); Antena de Oro for Professional Career (2004); National Radio Award (2013)

María del Carmen "Menchu" Álvarez del Valle (16 January 1928 – 27 July 2021) was a Spanish radio journalist and paternal grandmother of the queen consort of Spain, Letizia Ortiz Rocasolano.

== Biography and career ==
She was born in Santander, northern Spain on 16 January 1928, and moved to Oviedo at the age of 16, where she soon collaborated in Radio Asturias. In 1947 she made her professional debut on Radio Oviedo, and from there she went on to work on the radio stations "La Voz del Principado", "Radiocadena Española" and "Radio Nacional de España". Between 1974 and 1980 she was president of the Asturias Radio and Television Association. Her success in Asturias led her to be called "the voice of the Principality" (La voz del Principado). Among her most outstanding programs are Coser y cantar and Rumbo a la gloria and in the 1970s recorded with the Asturian Choir of Madrid an album of Christmas carols.

In 1982, she briefly appeared in television, on the TVE program Gol y Mundial 82. She retired in 1990.

== Personal life and death ==
Álvarez del Valle married José Luis Ortiz Velasco, an Olivetti commercial representative in 1949, with whom she had three children: Jesús José, María del Henar and Cristina. She was widowed on 30 March 2005, when Ortiz Velasco died at the age of 82 at his home in Sardéu, Ribadesella, after an illness. Her daughter Cristina died in 2001.

Álvarez del Valle rose to national fame when Jesús José's daughter Letizia Ortiz Rocasolano, also a journalist, announced her engagement to then-Prince of Asturias Felipe, the King of Spain since 2014. She maintained a very close relationship with Letizia Ortiz, who followed in her grandmother's footsteps in her training as a journalist. In the wedding of her granddaughter and Prince Felipe in May 2004, she read the letter of the apostle Paul to the Corinthians.

In September 2015, Álvarez del Valle, together with her two children Jesús and Henar, were acquitted by a court of Oviedo after being accused for several crimes of punishable insolvency. The private prosecution asked for two and a half years in prison and a fine for 16 months for each of them.

Álvarez del Valle's last years were spent between Ribadesella and Marbella, and it was common to see her at the Princess of Asturias Awards ceremony at the Campoamor Theater in Oviedo. She died at her home in Sardéu at the age of 93.

== Awards ==
- Antena de Oro. (1974)
- Antena de Oro. (2004)
- National Radio Award from the Spanish Academy of Radio Arts and Sciences. (2013)
- "Premio de Honor Gava" from the Cluster Association of the Creative, Cultural and Audiovisual Industry of Asturias. (2019)
