= Stinkstein =

Stinkstein (German for "stinking stone") has historically referred to:

- Antozonite, a radioactive fluorite variety
- dolomite, a carbonate mineral
