= Les Arriondes =

Coordinates: 43°23′20″N 5°11′11″W

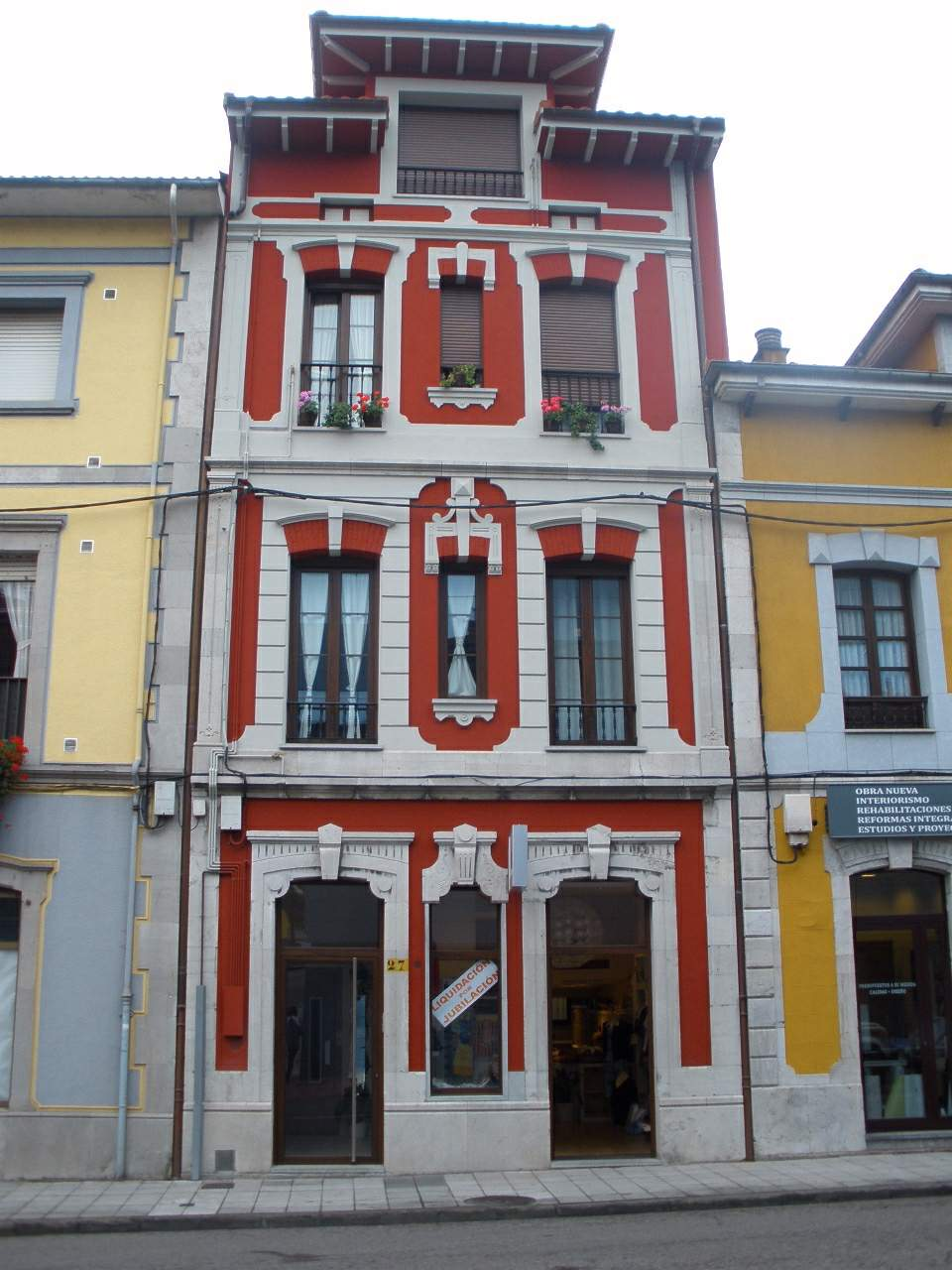

Arriondas (officially, in Asturian, Arriondas/Les Arriondes) is a village in the Spanish municipality of Parres, Asturias. It is located where the River Piloña joins the river Sella, in a narrow valley.

The convergence of rivers makes it an important place for fishing. The river makes a very good spot for canoeing, and every year the International Sella River Descent is held. This consists of a canoe race down the river Sella to the coastal village of Ribadesella. This competition brings in significant numbers of tourists. These make up one of the most important of the village's economic activities.
