= Menchu (disambiguation) =

Rigoberta Menchú (born 1959) is a K'iche' political and human rights activist from Guatemala.

Menchu or Menchú may also refer to:

- 9481 Menchú, a main-belt asteroid named after Rigoberta Menchú
- Menchu Álvarez del Valle (1928–2021), Spanish radio journalist and grandmother of the Queen of Spain, Letizia Ortiz Rocasolano
- Menchu Lauchengco-Yulo (born 1963), Filipino musical theatre actress
