= Llinares, Ribadesella =

Coordinates: 43.4429°N 5.1464°W

Llinares is one of nine parishes in Ribadesella, a municipality within the province and autonomous community of Asturias, in northern Spain.

It is 13.5 km^{2} (5.2 sq mi) in size, with a population of 150 (INE 2006).

Villages of the parish include Alea, Calabrez and Llinares.
