= Samiguel d'Ucio =

Coordinates: 43.45°N 5.09°W

Samiguel d'Ucio is one of nine parishes (administrative divisions) in Ribadesella, a municipality within the province and autonomous community of Asturias, in northern Spain.

It is 5.06 km^{2} (1.95 sq mi) in size, with a population of 367 (INE 2006).

== Villages ==
- Ardines
- Samiguel
- Sardalla
- Sebreñu
