= Xuncu =

Parish in Ribadesella, Asturias, Spain

Coordinates: 43.44°N 5.07°W

Xuncu (Asturian pronunciation: [ˈʃuŋku]) is one of nine parishes (administrative divisions) in Ribadesella, a municipality within the province and autonomous community of Asturias, in northern Spain.

It is 37.69 km^{2} (14.55 sq mi) in size, with a population of 144 (INE 2006).

== Villages ==
- Cueves
  - La Bolera
  - El Cantiellu
  - La Capilla
  - La Cueva
  - La Estación
  - La Riega
- Xuncu
  - L'Acebéu
  - L'Alisal
  - La Cerezalina
  - El Cierru
  - El Colláu
  - L'Escayón
  - La Güelga
  - El Llagarón
  - El Malez
  - El Palaciu de Xuncu
  - El Reboriu
  - El Regüetu
  - La Roza
  - El Toral
  - La Torre
