= Fluorite =

Mineral form of calcium fluoride

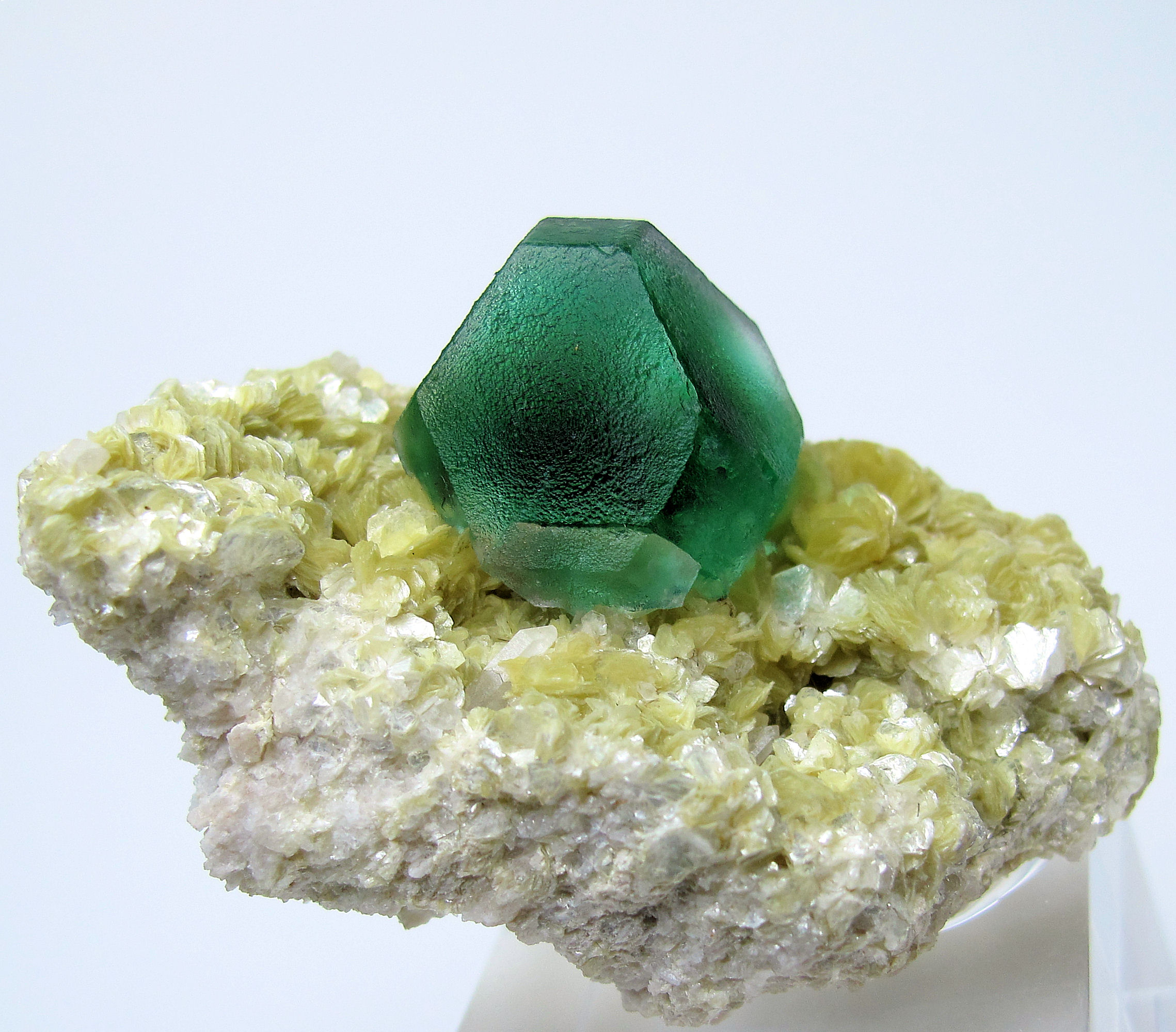
- Deep green isolated fluorite crystal resembling a truncated octahedron, set upon a micaceous matrix, from Erongo Mountain, Erongo Region, Namibia (overall size: 50 mm × 27 mm, crystal size: 19 mm wide, 30 g)

General
- Category: Halide mineral
- Formula: CaF_{2}
- IMA symbol: Flr
- Strunz classification: 3.AB.25
- Crystal system: Isometric
- Crystal class: Hexoctahedral (m3̅m); H–M symbol: (4/m 3̅ 2/m) (cF12)
- Space group: Fm3̅m (No. 225)
- Unit cell: a = 5.4626 Å; Z = 4

Identification
- Color: Colorless, although samples are often deeply colored owing to impurities; Purple, lilac, golden-yellow, green, blue, pink, champagne, brown.
- Crystal habit: Well-formed coarse sized crystals; also nodular, botryoidal, rarely columnar or fibrous; granular, massive
- Twinning: Common on {111}, interpenetrant, flattened
- Cleavage: Octahedral, perfect on {111}, parting on {011}
- Fracture: Subconchoidal to uneven
- Tenacity: Brittle
- Mohs scale hardness: 4 (defining mineral)
- Luster: Vitreous
- Streak: White
- Diaphaneity: Transparent to translucent
- Specific gravity: 3.175–3.184; to 3.56 if high in rare-earth elements
- Optical properties: Isotropic; weak anomalous anisotropism; moderate relief
- Refractive index: 1.433–1.448
- Fusibility: 3
- Solubility: slightly water soluble and in hot hydrochloric acid
- Other characteristics: May be fluorescent, phosphorescent, thermoluminescent, and/or triboluminescent

Fluorite (also called fluorspar) is the mineral form of calcium fluoride, CaF_{2}. It belongs to the halide minerals. It crystallizes in isometric cubic habit, although octahedral and more complex isometric forms are not uncommon.

The Mohs scale of mineral hardness, based on scratch hardness comparison, defines value 4 as fluorite.

Pure fluorite is colourless and transparent, both in visible and ultraviolet light, but impurities usually make it a colorful mineral and the stone has ornamental and lapidary uses. Industrially, fluorite is used as a flux for smelting, and in the production of certain glasses and enamels. The purest grades of fluorite are a source of fluoride for hydrofluoric acid manufacture, which is the intermediate source of most fluorine-containing fine chemicals. Optically clear transparent fluorite has anomalous partial dispersion, that is, its refractive index varies with the wavelength of light in a manner that differs from that of commonly used glasses, so fluorite is useful in making apochromatic lenses, and particularly valuable in photographic optics. Fluorite optics are also usable in the far-ultraviolet and mid-infrared ranges, where conventional glasses are too opaque for use. Fluorite also has low dispersion, and a high refractive index for its density.

== History and etymology ==
The word fluorite is derived from the Latin verb fluere, meaning to flow. The mineral is used as a flux in iron smelting to decrease the viscosity of slag. The term flux comes from the Latin adjective fluxus, meaning flowing, loose, slack. The mineral fluorite, originally termed fluorspar, was first printed in a 1530 work Bermannvs sive de re metallica dialogus [Bermannus; or dialogue about the nature of metals], by Georgius Agricola, as a mineral noted for its usefulness as a flux. Agricola, a German scientist with expertise in philology, mining, and metallurgy, named fluorspar as a Neo-Latinization of the German Flussspat from Fluss (short for Flussmittel smelting flux) and Spat (meaning a nonmetallic mineral akin to gypsum, spærstān, spear stone, referring to its crystalline projections).

In 1852, fluorite gave its name to the phenomenon of fluorescence, which is prominent in fluorites from certain locations, due to certain impurities in the mineral. Fluorite also gave the name to its constitutive element fluorine. Currently, the word "fluorspar" is most commonly used for fluorite as an industrial and chemical commodity, while "fluorite" is used mineralogically and in most other senses.

In archeology, gemmology, classical studies, and Egyptology, the Latin terms murrina and myrrhina refer to fluorite. In book 37 of his Naturalis Historia, Pliny the Elder describes it as a precious stone with purple and white mottling, and noted that the Romans prized objects carved from it. It has been suggested that the Sanskrit mineral name vaikrānta (वैक्रान्तः), known from Sanskrit alchemical texts dating from the early second millennium CE onwards, may refer to fluorite.

== Structure ==
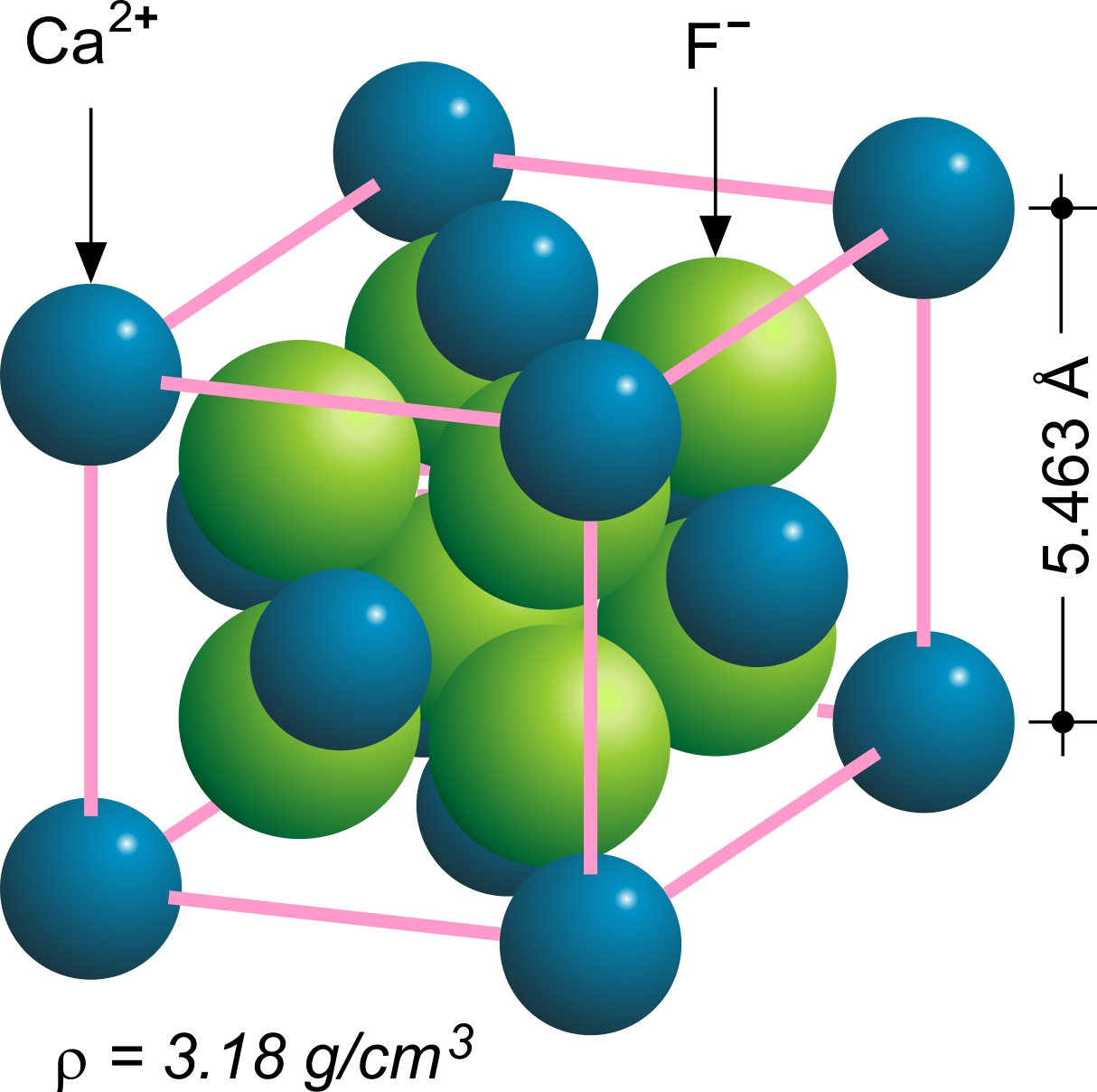
The structure of calcium fluoride CaF_{2}.

Fluorite crystallizes in a cubic motif. Crystal twinning is common and adds complexity to the observed crystal habits. Fluorite has four perfect cleavage planes that help produce octahedral fragments. The structural motif adopted by fluorite is so common that the motif is called the fluorite structure. Element substitution for the calcium cation often includes strontium and certain rare-earth elements (REE), such as yttrium and cerium.

== Occurrence and mining ==
Fluorspar production

Fluorite forms as a late-crystallizing mineral in felsic igneous rocks typically through hydrothermal activity. It is particularly common in granitic pegmatites. It may occur as a vein deposit formed through hydrothermal activity particularly in limestones. In such vein deposits it can be associated with galena, sphalerite, barite, quartz, and calcite. Fluorite can also be found as a constituent of sedimentary rocks either as grains or as the cementing material in sandstone.

It is a common mineral distributed in South Africa, Thailand, China, Russia, Argentina, Brazil, Mexico, Mongolia, South Korea, the United Kingdom, Spain, Japan, the United States, Kazakhstan, Australia, Canada, Pakistan, Iran, Tanzania and Rwanda.

The world reserves of fluorite are estimated at 230 million tonnes (Mt) with the largest deposits being in South Africa (about 41 Mt), Mexico (32 Mt) and China (24 Mt). China is leading the world production with about 3 Mt annually (in 2010), followed by Mexico (1.0 Mt), Mongolia (0.45 Mt), Russia (0.22 Mt), South Africa (0.13 Mt), Spain (0.12 Mt) and Namibia (0.11 Mt).

One of the largest deposits of fluorspar in North America is located on the Burin Peninsula, Newfoundland, Canada. The first official recognition of fluorspar in the area was recorded by geologist J.B. Jukes in 1843. He noted an occurrence of "galena" or lead ore and fluoride of lime on the west side of St. Lawrence harbour. It is recorded that interest in the commercial mining of fluorspar began in 1928 with the first ore being extracted in 1933. Eventually, at Iron Springs Mine, the shafts reached depths of 970 feet (300 m). In the St. Lawrence area, the veins are persistent for great lengths and several of them have wide lenses. The area with veins of known workable size comprises about 60 square miles (160 km^{2}).

In 2018, Canada Fluorspar Inc. commenced mine production again in St. Lawrence; in spring 2019, the company was planned to develop a new shipping port on the west side of Burin Peninsula as a more affordable means of moving their product to markets, and they successfully sent the first shipload of ore from the new port on July 31, 2021. This marks the first time in 30 years that ore has been shipped directly out of St. Lawrence.

Cubic crystals up to 20 cm across have been found at Dalnegorsk, Russia. The largest documented single crystal of fluorite was a cube 2.12 meters in size and weighing approximately 16 tonnes.

In Asturias (Spain) there are several fluorite deposits known internationally for the quality of the specimens they have yielded. In the area of Berbes, Ribadesella, fluorite appears as cubic crystals, sometimes with dodecahedron modifications, which can reach a size of up to 10 cm of edge, with internal colour zoning, almost always violet in colour. It is associated with quartz and leafy aggregates of baryte. In the Emilio mine, in Loroñe, Colunga, the fluorite crystals, cubes with small modifications of other figures, are colourless and transparent. They can reach 10 cm of edge. In the Moscona mine, in Villabona, the fluorite crystals, cubic without modifications of other shapes, are yellow, up to 3 cm of edge. They are associated with large crystals of calcite and barite.

=== "Blue John" ===
One of the most famous of the older-known localities of fluorite is Castleton in Derbyshire, England, where, under the name of "Derbyshire Blue John", purple-blue fluorite was extracted from several mines or caves. During the 19th century, this attractive fluorite was mined for its ornamental value. The mineral Blue John is now scarce, and only a few hundred kilograms are mined each year for ornamental and lapidary use. Mining still takes place in Blue John Cavern and Treak Cliff Cavern.

Recently discovered deposits in China have produced fluorite with coloring and banding similar to the classic Blue John stone.

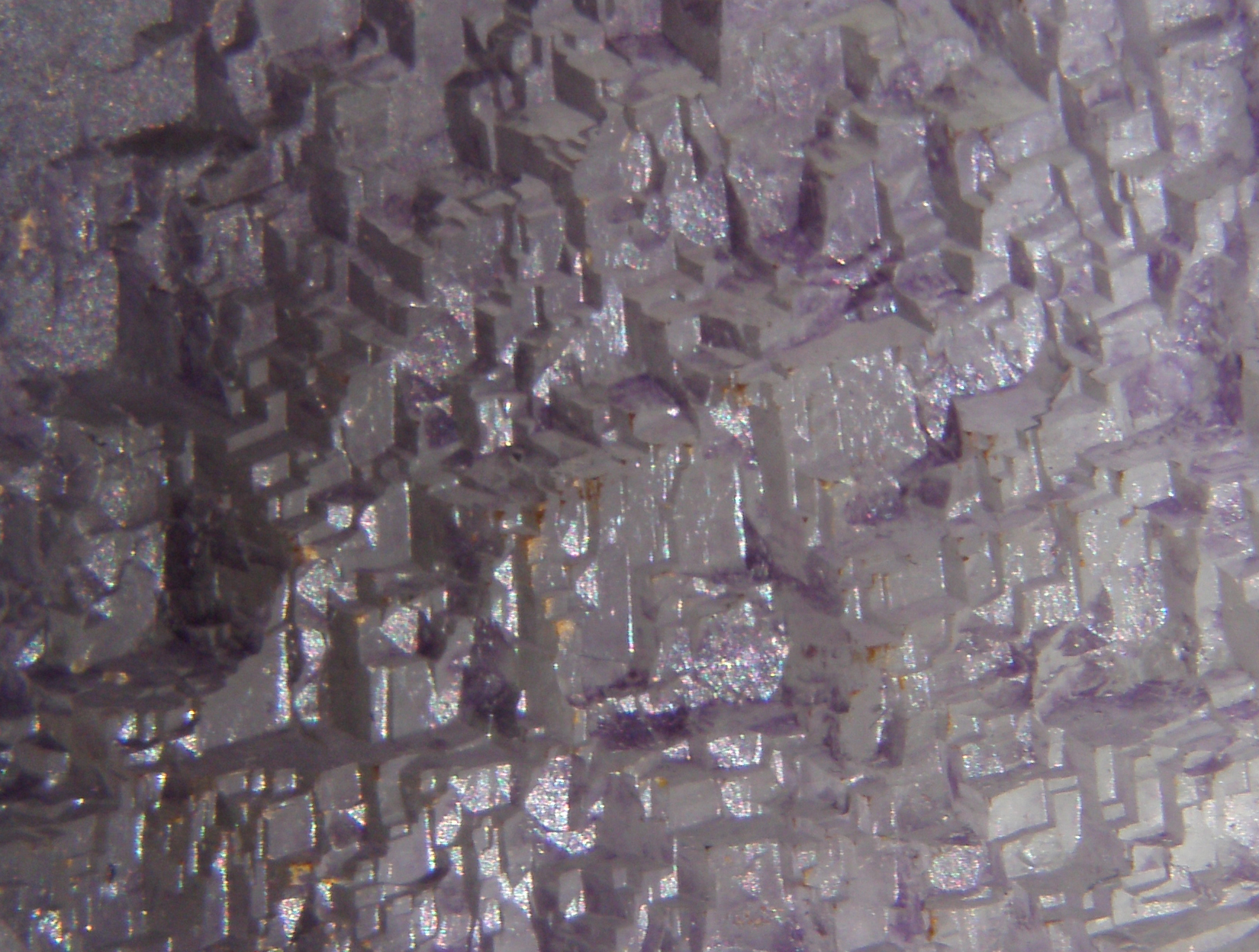
A closeup of fluorite surface

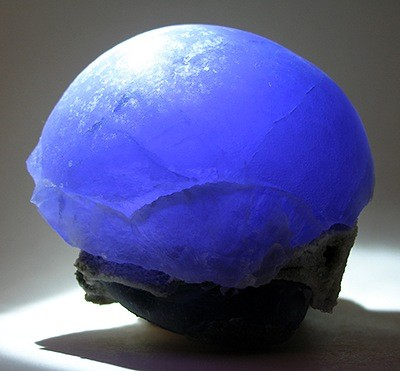
Blue Fluorite, from Shihe District, Henan Province, China

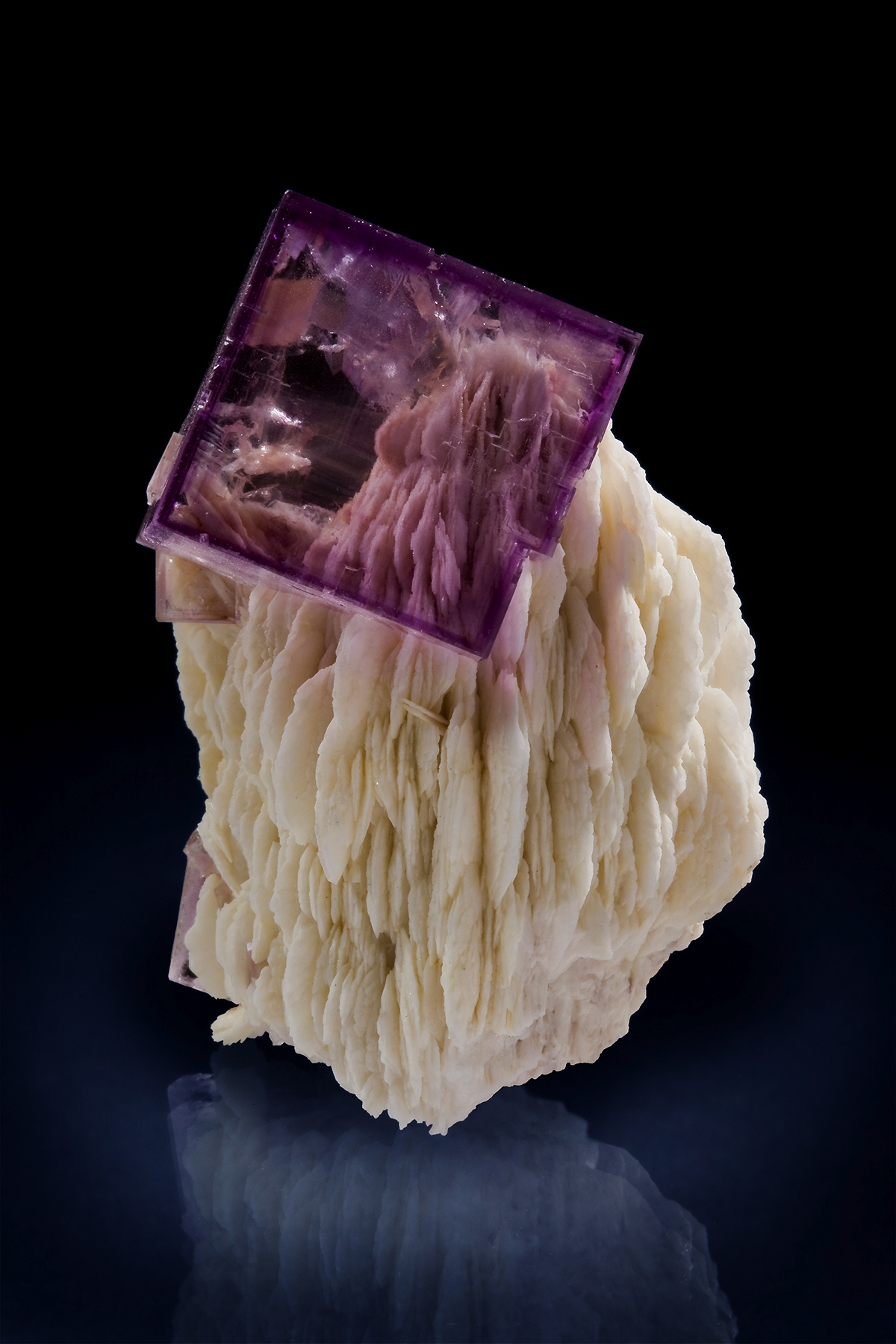
Fluorite on barite from the Berbes mine, Ribadesella, Asturias (Spain). Fluorite crystal, 2.2 cm.

== Fluorescence ==
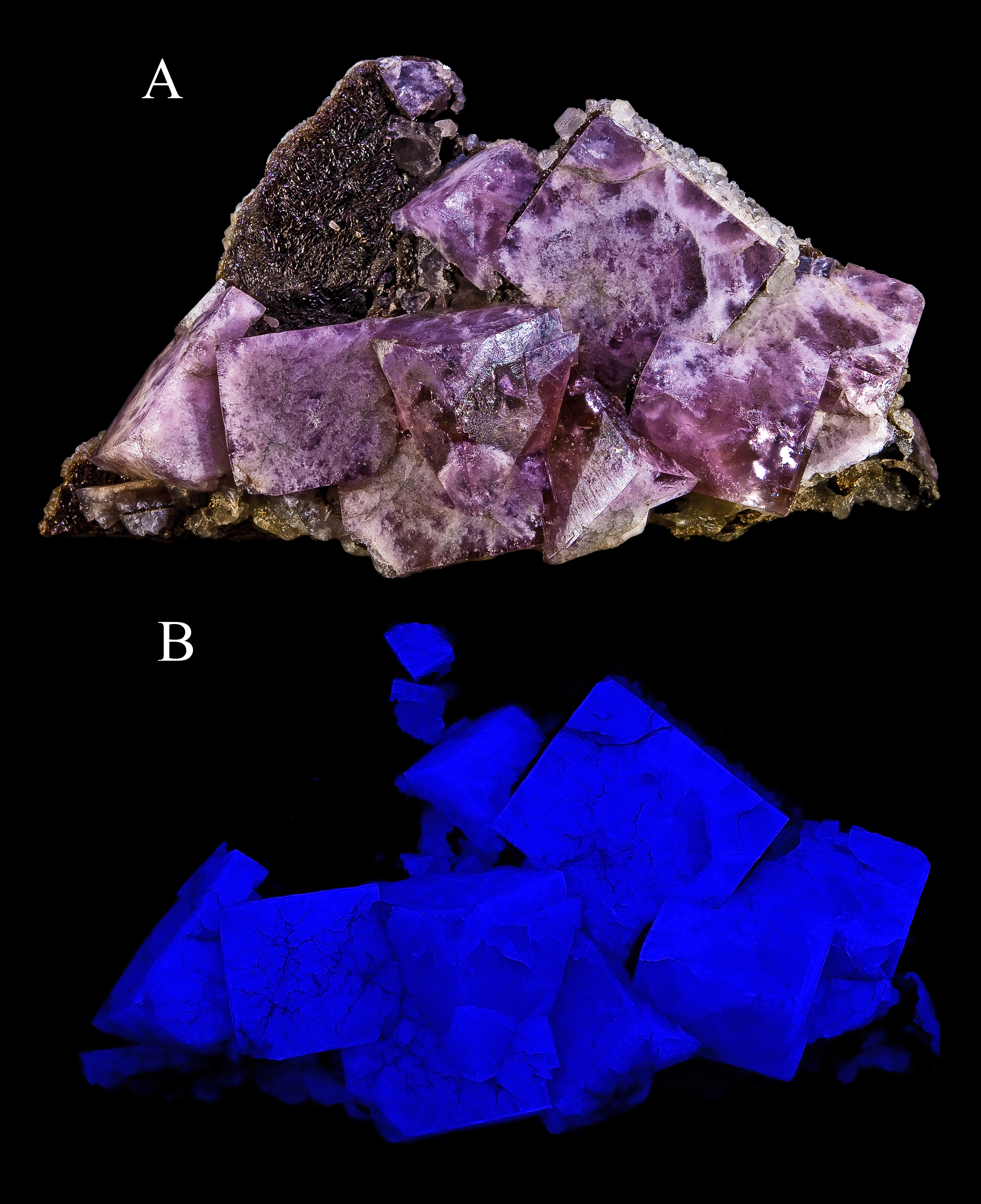
Fluorescing fluorite from Boltsburn Mine, Weardale, North Pennines, County Durham, England, UK.

George Gabriel Stokes named the phenomenon of fluorescence from fluorite, in 1852.

Many samples of fluorite exhibit fluorescence under ultraviolet light, a property that takes its name from fluorite. Many minerals, as well as other substances, fluoresce. Fluorescence involves the elevation of electron energy levels by quanta of ultraviolet light, followed by the progressive falling back of the electrons into their previous energy state, releasing quanta of visible light in the process. In fluorite, the visible light emitted is most commonly blue, but red, purple, yellow, green, and white also occur. The fluorescence of fluorite may be due to mineral impurities, such as yttrium and ytterbium, or organic matter, such as volatile hydrocarbons in the crystal lattice. In particular, the blue fluorescence seen in fluorites from certain parts of Great Britain responsible for the naming of the phenomenon of fluorescence itself, has been attributed to the presence of inclusions of divalent europium in the crystal. Natural samples containing rare earth impurities such as erbium have also been observed to display upconversion fluorescence, in which infrared light stimulates emission of visible light, a phenomenon usually only reported in synthetic materials.

One fluorescent variety of fluorite is chlorophane, which is reddish or purple in color and fluoresces brightly in emerald green when heated (thermoluminescence), or when illuminated with ultraviolet light.

The color of visible light emitted when a sample of fluorite is fluorescing depends on where the original specimen was collected; different impurities having been included in the crystal lattice in different places. Neither does all fluorite fluoresce equally brightly, even from the same locality. Therefore, ultraviolet light is not a reliable tool for the identification of specimens, nor for quantifying the mineral in mixtures. For example, among British fluorites, those from Northumberland, County Durham, and eastern Cumbria are the most consistently fluorescent, whereas fluorite from Yorkshire, Derbyshire, and Cornwall, if they fluoresce at all, are generally only feebly fluorescent.

Fluorite also exhibits the property of thermoluminescence.

== Color ==
Fluorite is allochromatic, meaning that it can be tinted with elemental impurities. Fluorite comes in a wide range of colors and has consequently been dubbed "the most colorful mineral in the world". Every color of the rainbow in various shades is represented by fluorite samples, along with white, black, and clear crystals. The most common colors are purple, blue, green, yellow, or colorless. Less common are pink, red, white, brown, and black. Color zoning or banding is commonly present. The color of the fluorite is determined by factors including impurities, exposure to radiation, and the absence of voids of the color centers.

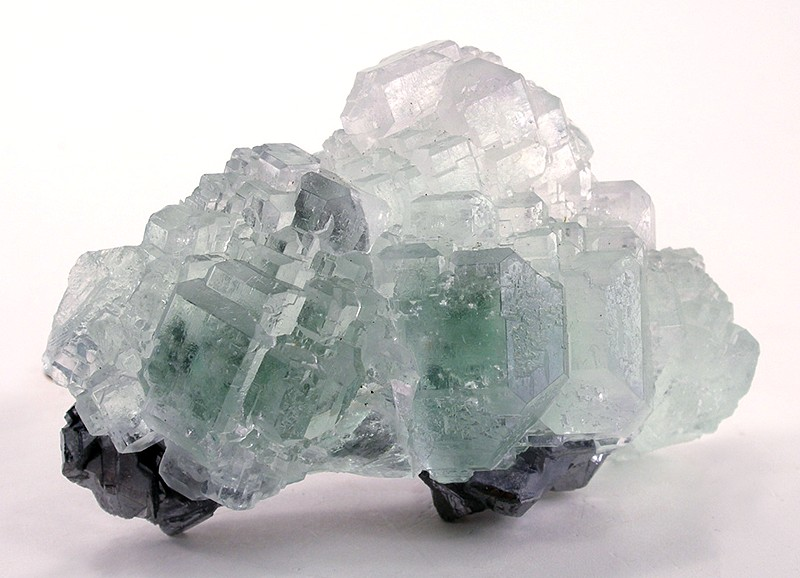
Pastel green fluorite crystal on galena

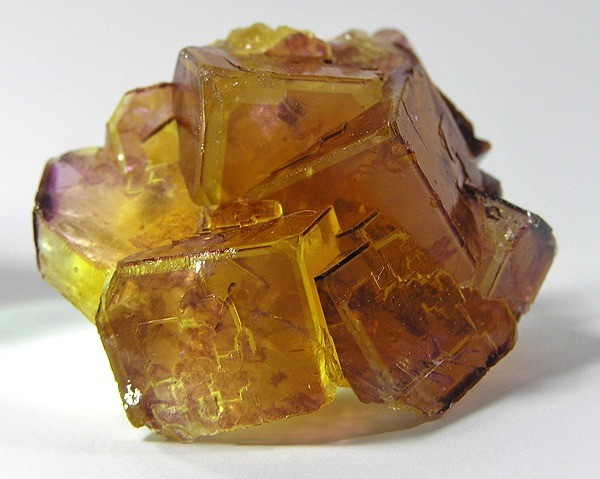
A golden yellow with hints of purple fluorite

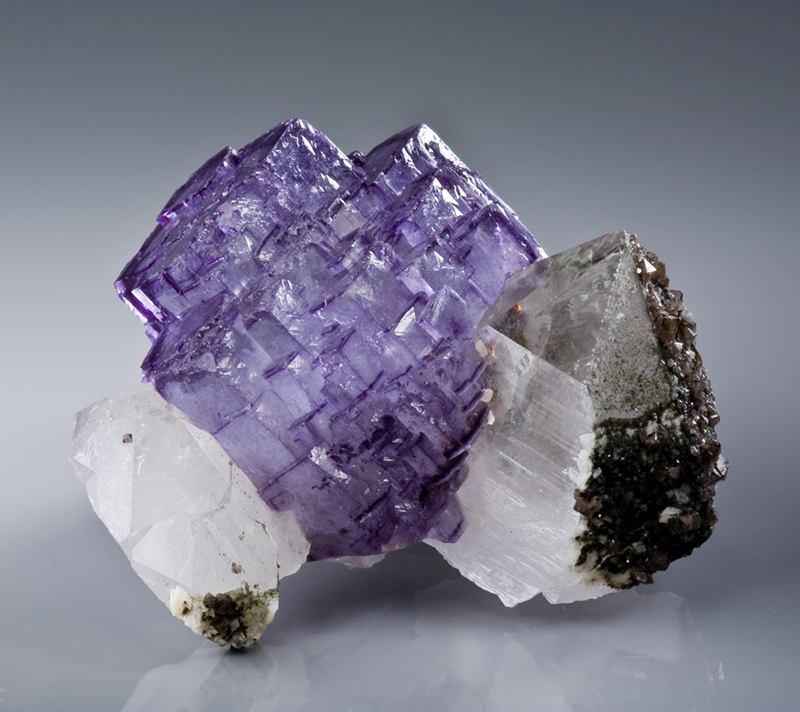
Freestanding purple fluorite cluster between two quartzes

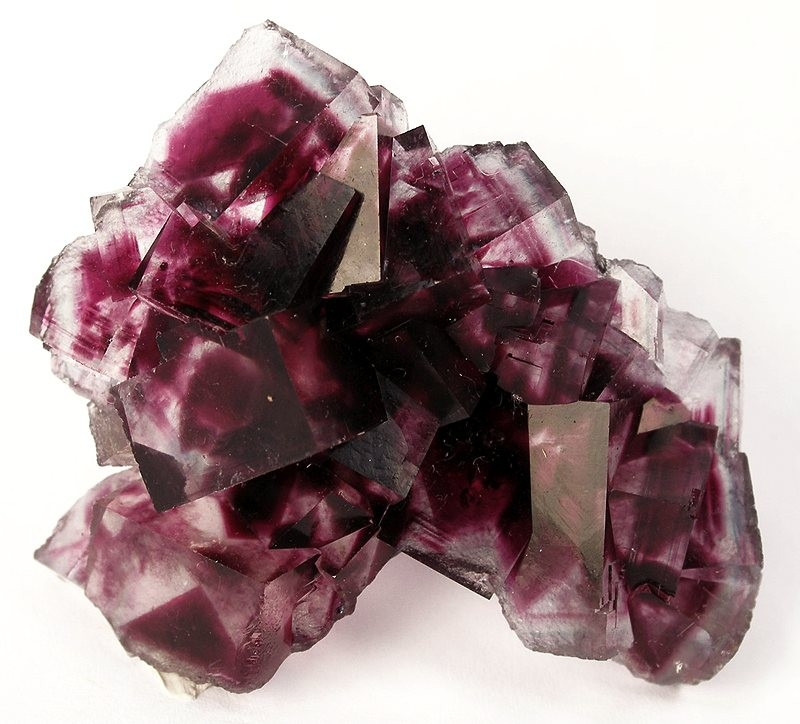
Light to dark burgundy color fluorite

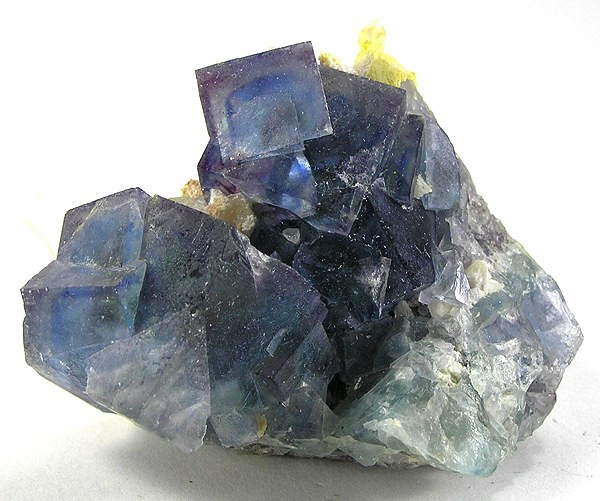
Transparent teal color fluorite with purple highlights

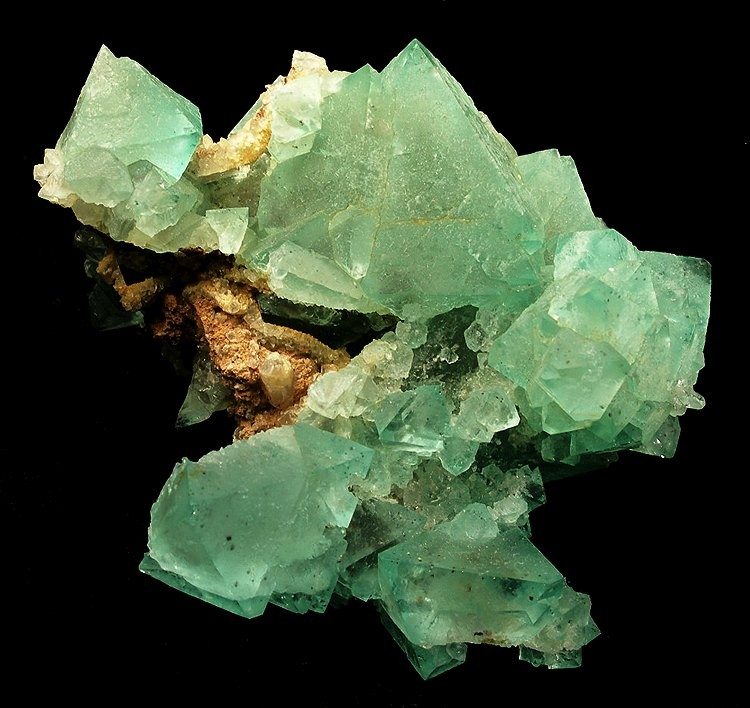
Grass-green fluorite octahedrons clustered on a quartz-rich matrix

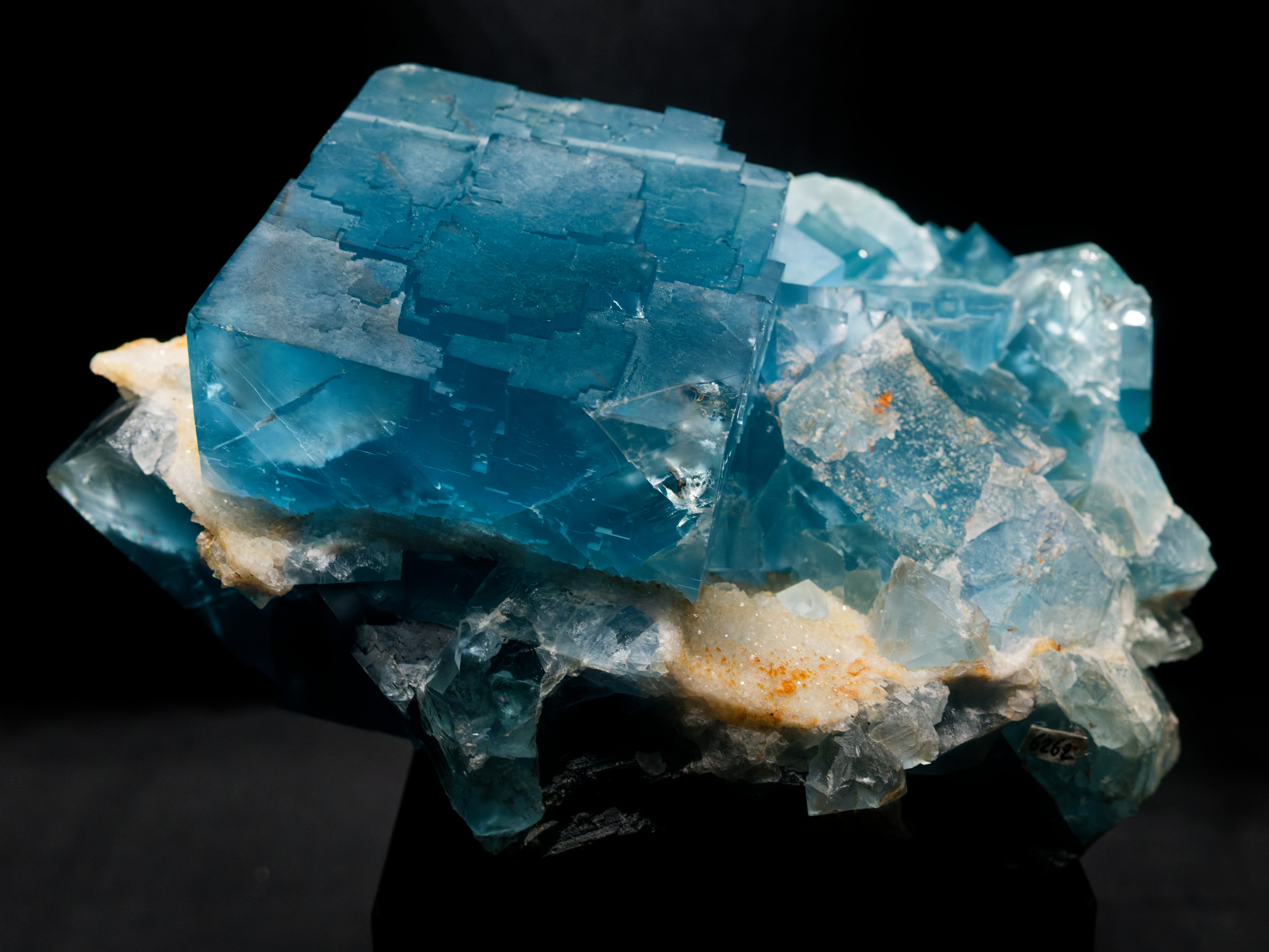
Electric blue fluorite

== Uses ==
=== Source of fluorine and fluoride ===
Fluorite is a major source of hydrogen fluoride, a commodity chemical used to produce a wide range of materials. Hydrogen fluoride is liberated from the mineral by the action of concentrated sulfuric acid:

CaF_{2}(s) + H_{2}SO_{4} → CaSO_{4}(s) + 2 HF(g)

The resulting HF is converted into fluorine, fluorocarbons, and diverse fluoride materials. As of the late 1990s, five billion kilograms were mined annually.

There are three principal types of industrial use for natural fluorite, commonly referred to as "fluorspar" in these industries, corresponding to different grades of purity. Metallurgical grade fluorite (60–85% CaF_{2}), the lowest of the three grades, has traditionally been used as a flux to lower the melting point of raw materials in steel production to aid the removal of impurities, and later in the production of aluminium. Ceramic grade fluorite (85–95% CaF_{2}) is used in the manufacture of opalescent glass, enamels, and cooking utensils. The highest grade, "acid grade fluorite" (97% or more CaF_{2}), accounts for about 95% of fluorite consumption in the US where it is used to make hydrogen fluoride and hydrofluoric acid by reacting the fluorite with sulfuric acid.

Internationally, acid-grade fluorite is also used in the production of AlF_{3} and cryolite (Na_{3}AlF_{6}), which are the main fluorine compounds used in aluminium smelting. Alumina is dissolved in a bath that consists primarily of molten Na_{3}AlF_{6}, AlF_{3}, and fluorite (CaF_{2}) to allow electrolytic recovery of aluminium. Fluorine losses are replaced entirely by the addition of AlF_{3}, the majority of which react with excess sodium from the alumina to form Na_{3}AlF_{6}.

=== Niche uses ===
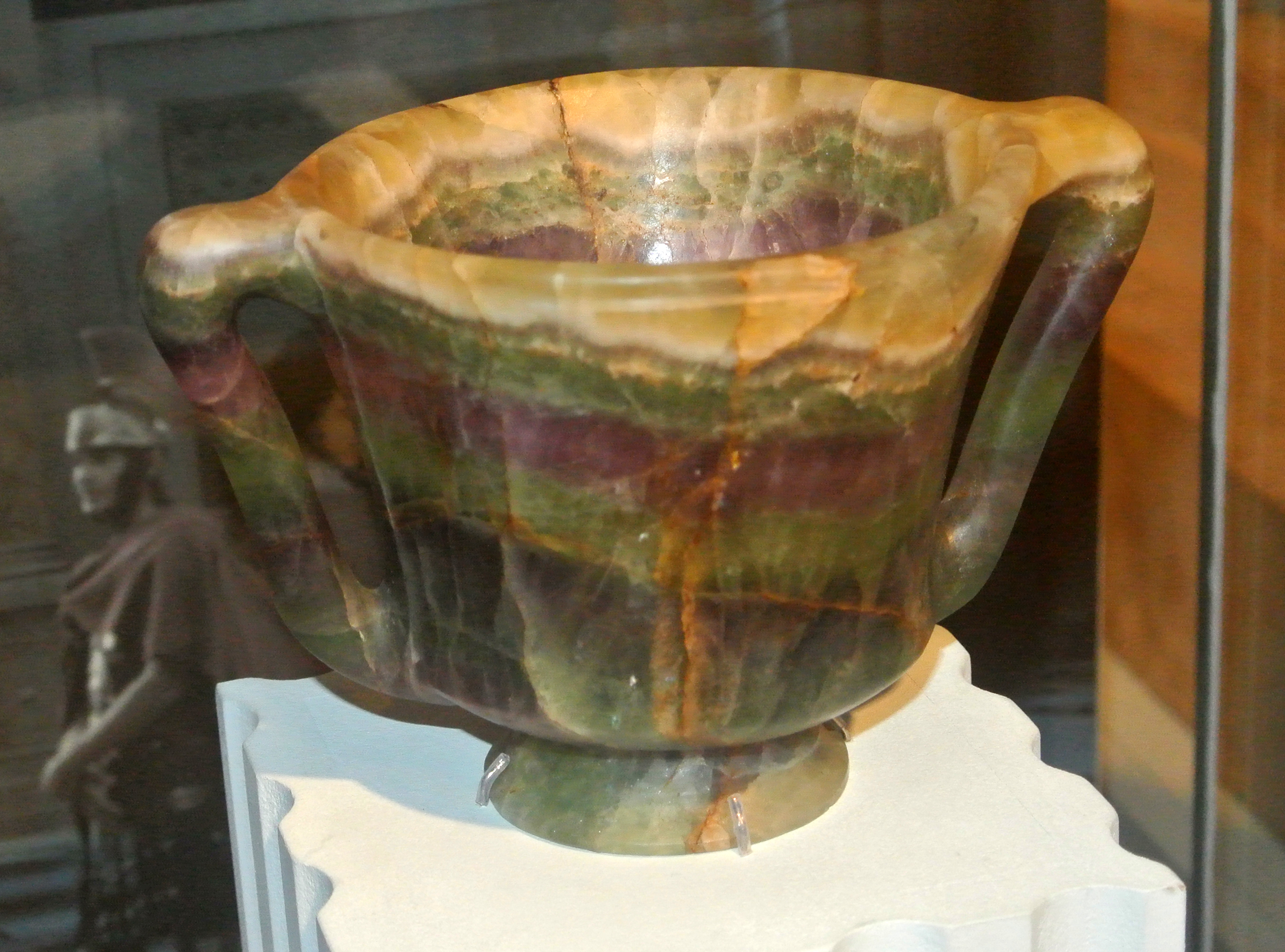
Crawford Cup (Roman, 50-100 CE) in the collection of the British Museum. Made of fluorite.

==== Lapidary uses ====
Natural fluorite mineral has ornamental and lapidary uses. Fluorite may be drilled into beads and used in jewelry, although due to its relative softness it is not widely used as a semiprecious stone. It is also used for ornamental carvings, with expert carvings taking advantage of the stone's zonation.

==== Optics ====
In the laboratory, calcium fluoride is commonly used as a window material for both infrared and ultraviolet wavelengths, since it is transparent in these regions (about 150 to 9000 nm) and exhibits an extremely low change in refractive index with wavelength. Furthermore, the material is attacked by few reagents. At wavelengths as short as 157 nm, a common wavelength used for semiconductor stepper manufacture for integrated circuit lithography, the refractive index of calcium fluoride shows some non-linearity at high power densities, which has inhibited its use for this purpose. In the early years of the 21st century, the stepper market for calcium fluoride collapsed, and many large manufacturing facilities have been closed. Canon and other manufacturers have used synthetically grown crystals of calcium fluoride components in lenses to aid apochromatic design, and to reduce light dispersion. This use has largely been superseded by newer glasses and computer-aided design. As an infrared optical material, calcium fluoride is widely available and was sometimes known by the Eastman Kodak trademarked name "Irtran-3", although this designation is obsolete.

Fluorite should not be confused with fluoro-crown (or fluorine crown) glass, a type of low-dispersion glass that has special optical properties approaching fluorite. True fluorite is not a glass but a crystalline material. Lenses or optical groups made using this low dispersion glass as one or more elements exhibit less chromatic aberration than those utilizing conventional, less expensive crown glass and flint glass elements to make an achromatic lens. Optical groups employ a combination of different types of glass; each type of glass refracts light in a different way. By using combinations of different types of glass, lens manufacturers are able to cancel out or significantly reduce unwanted characteristics; chromatic aberration being the most important. The best of such lens designs are often called apochromatic (see above). Fluoro-crown glass (such as Schott FK51) usually in combination with an appropriate "flint" glass (such as Schott KzFSN 2) can give very high performance in telescope objective lenses, as well as microscope objectives, and camera telephoto lenses. Fluorite elements are similarly paired with complementary "flint" elements (such as Schott LaK 10). The refractive qualities of fluorite and of certain flint elements provide a lower and more uniform dispersion across the spectrum of visible light, thereby keeping colors focused more closely together. Lenses made with fluorite are superior to fluoro-crown based lenses, at least for doublet telescope objectives; but are more difficult to produce and more costly.

The use of fluorite for prisms and lenses was studied and promoted by Victor Schumann near the end of the 19th century. Naturally occurring fluorite crystals without optical defects were only large enough to produce microscope objectives.

With the advent of synthetically grown fluorite crystals in the 1950s - 60s, it could be used instead of glass in some high-performance optical telescope and camera lens elements. In telescopes, fluorite elements allow high-resolution images of astronomical objects at high magnifications. Canon Inc. produces synthetic fluorite crystals that are used in their better telephoto lenses. The use of fluorite for telescope lenses has declined since the 1990s, as newer designs using fluoro-crown glass, including triplets, have offered comparable performance at lower prices. Fluorite and various combinations of fluoride compounds can be made into synthetic crystals which have applications in lasers and special optics for UV and infrared.

Exposure tools for the semiconductor industry make use of fluorite optical elements for ultraviolet light at wavelengths of about 157 nanometers. Fluorite has a uniquely high transparency at this wavelength. Fluorite objective lenses are manufactured by the larger microscope firms (Nikon, Olympus, Carl Zeiss and Leica). Their transparency to ultraviolet light enables them to be used for fluorescence microscopy. The fluorite also serves to correct optical aberrations in these lenses. Nikon has previously manufactured at least one fluorite and synthetic quartz element camera lens (105 mm f/4.5 UV) for the production of ultraviolet images. Konica produced a fluorite lens for their SLR cameras – the Hexanon 300 mm f/6.3.

== Source of fluorine gas in nature ==
In 2012, the first source of naturally occurring fluorine gas was found in fluorite mines in Bavaria, Germany. It was previously thought that fluorine gas did not occur naturally because it is so reactive, and would rapidly react with other chemicals. Fluorite is normally colorless, but some varied forms found nearby look black, and are known as 'fetid fluorite' or antozonite. The minerals, containing small amounts of uranium and its daughter products, release radiation sufficiently energetic to induce oxidation of fluoride anions within the structure, to fluorine that becomes trapped inside the mineral. The color of fetid fluorite is predominantly due to the calcium atoms remaining. Solid-state fluorine-19 NMR carried out on the gas contained in the antozonite, revealed a peak at 425 ppm, which is consistent with F_{2}.

== Gallery ==
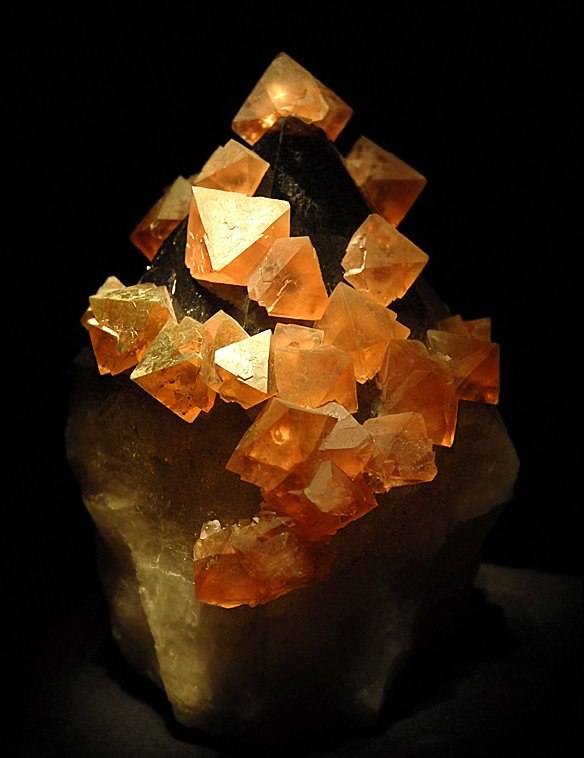
Fluorite crystals on display at the Cullen Hall of Gems and Minerals, Houston Museum of Natural Science

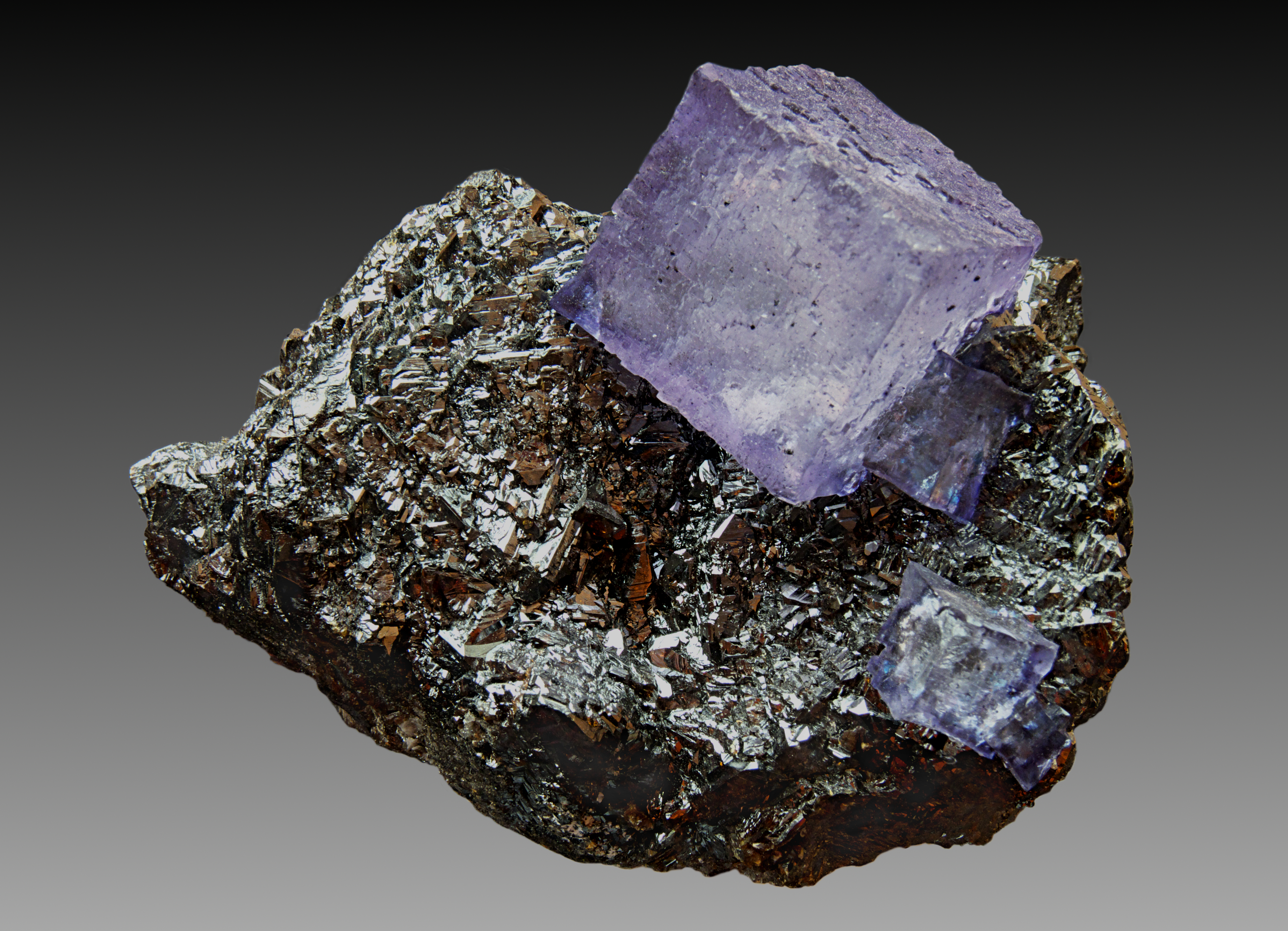
Fluorite and sphalerite, from Elmwood mine, Smith county, Tennessee, US

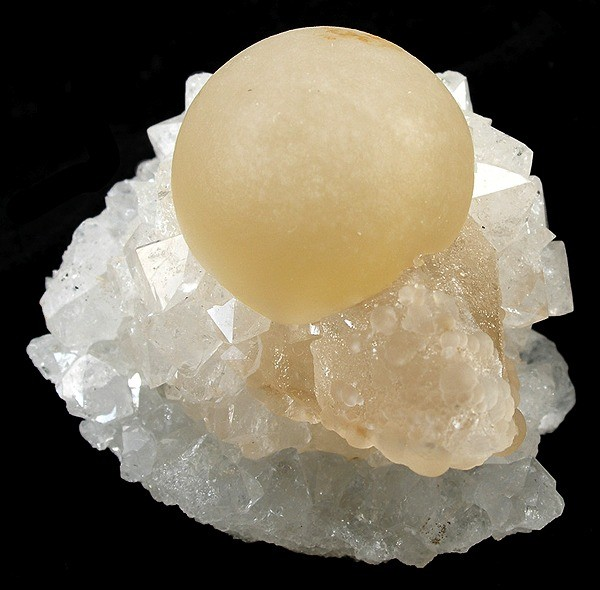
Translucent ball of botryoidal fluorite perched on a calcite crystal

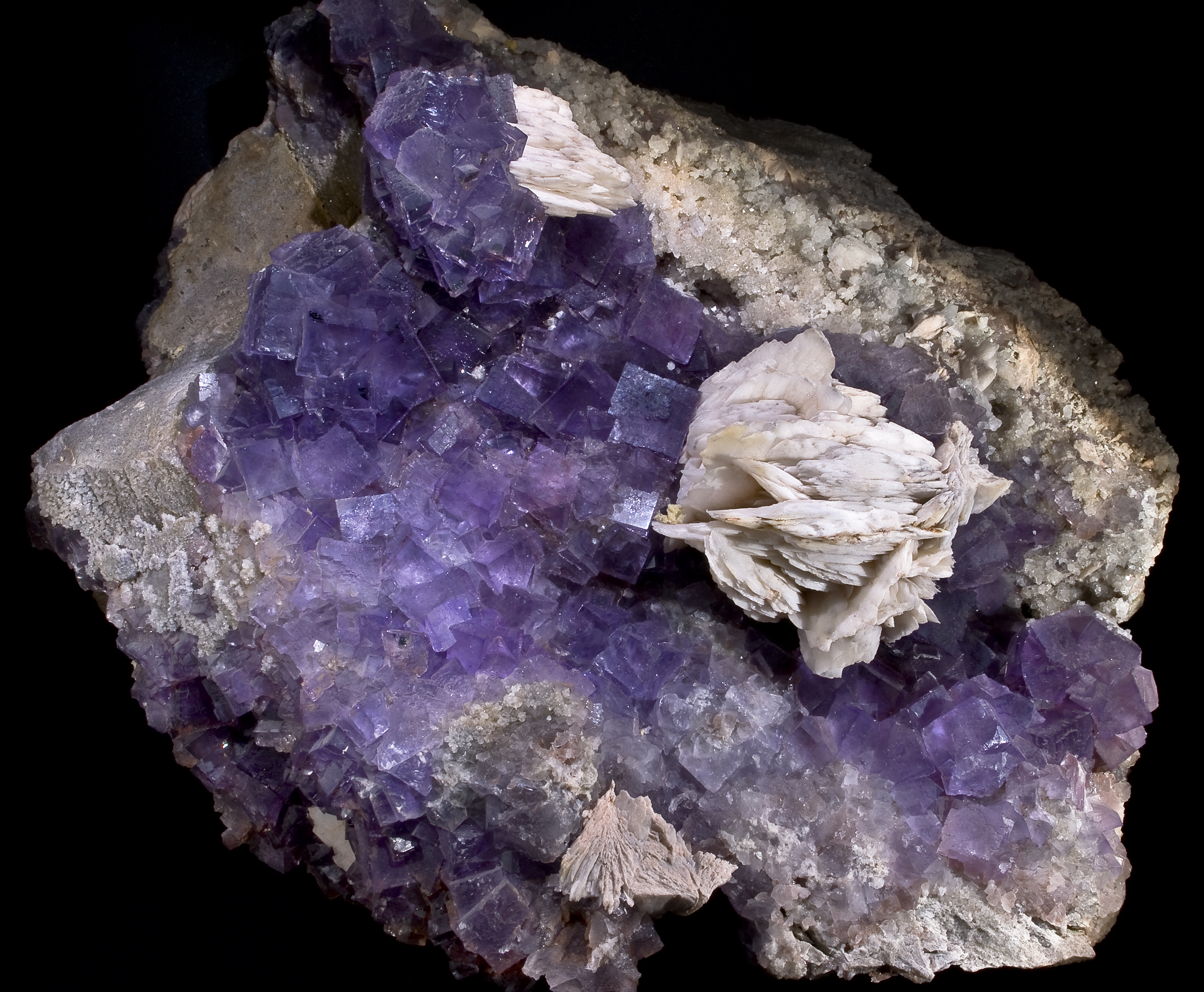
Fluorite with baryte, from Berbes Mine, Berbes Mining area, Ribadesella, Asturias, Spain

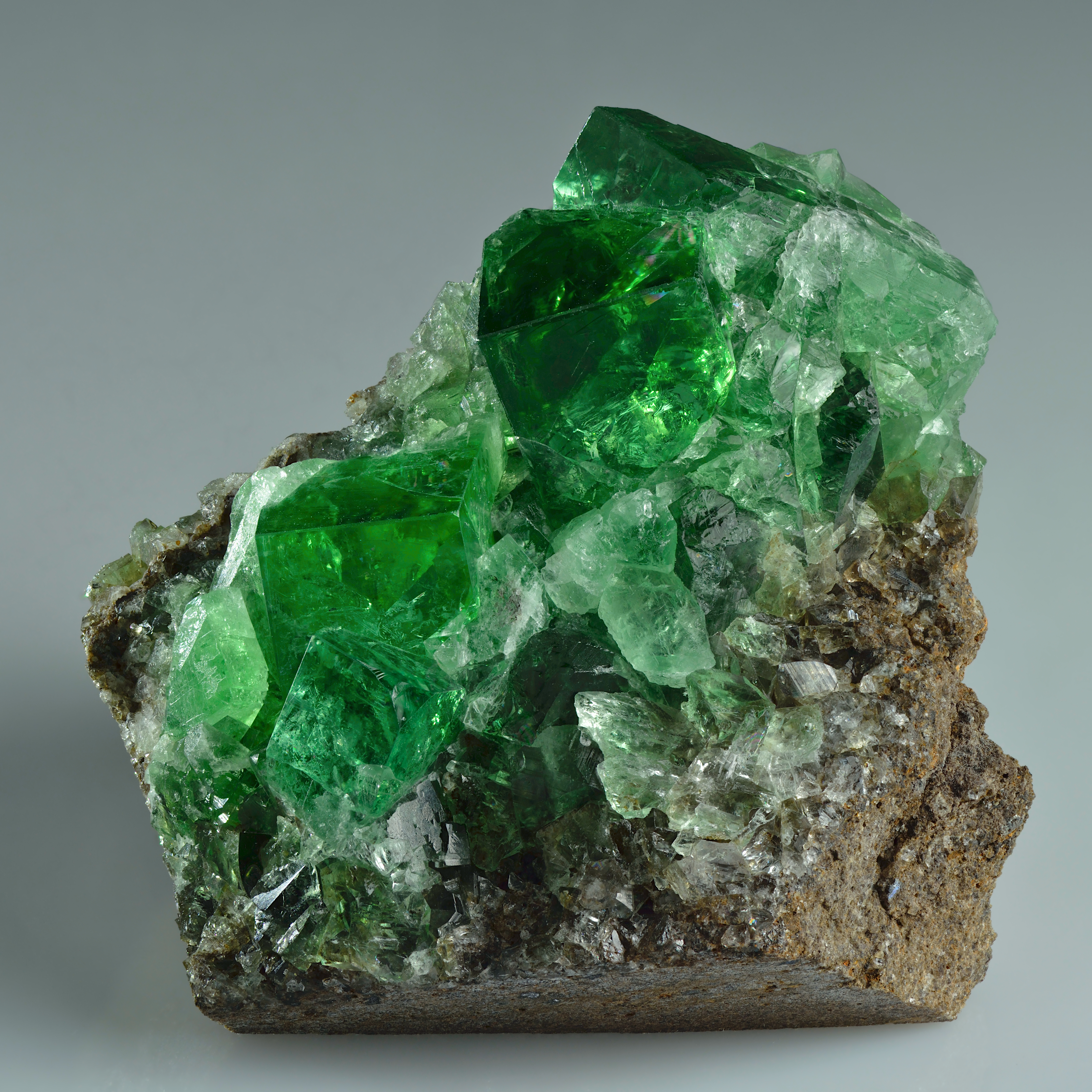
Fluorite from Diana Maria mine, Weardale, England, UK

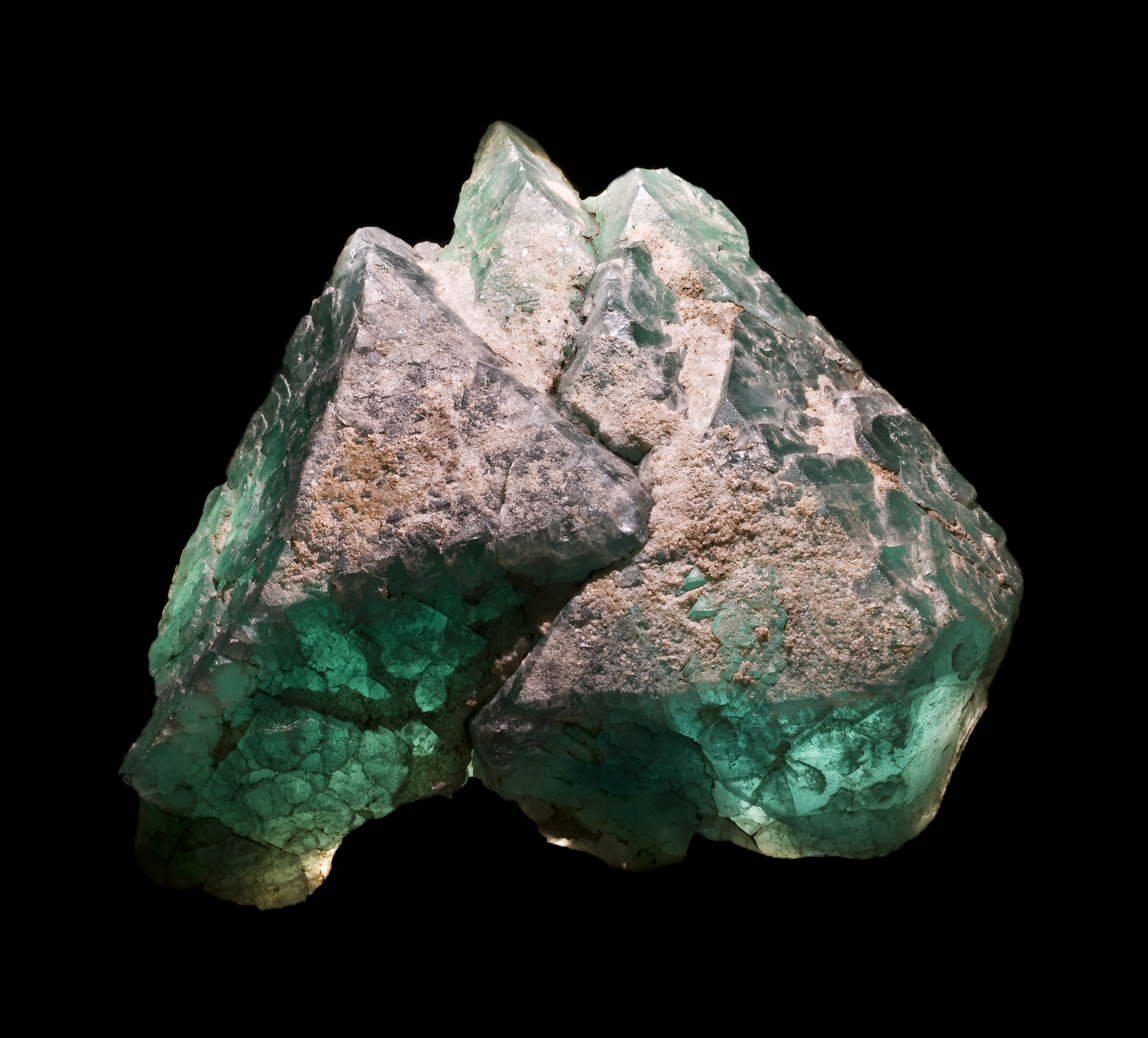
Fluorite from El Hammam Mine, Meknès Prefecture, Meknès-Tafilalet Region, Morocco

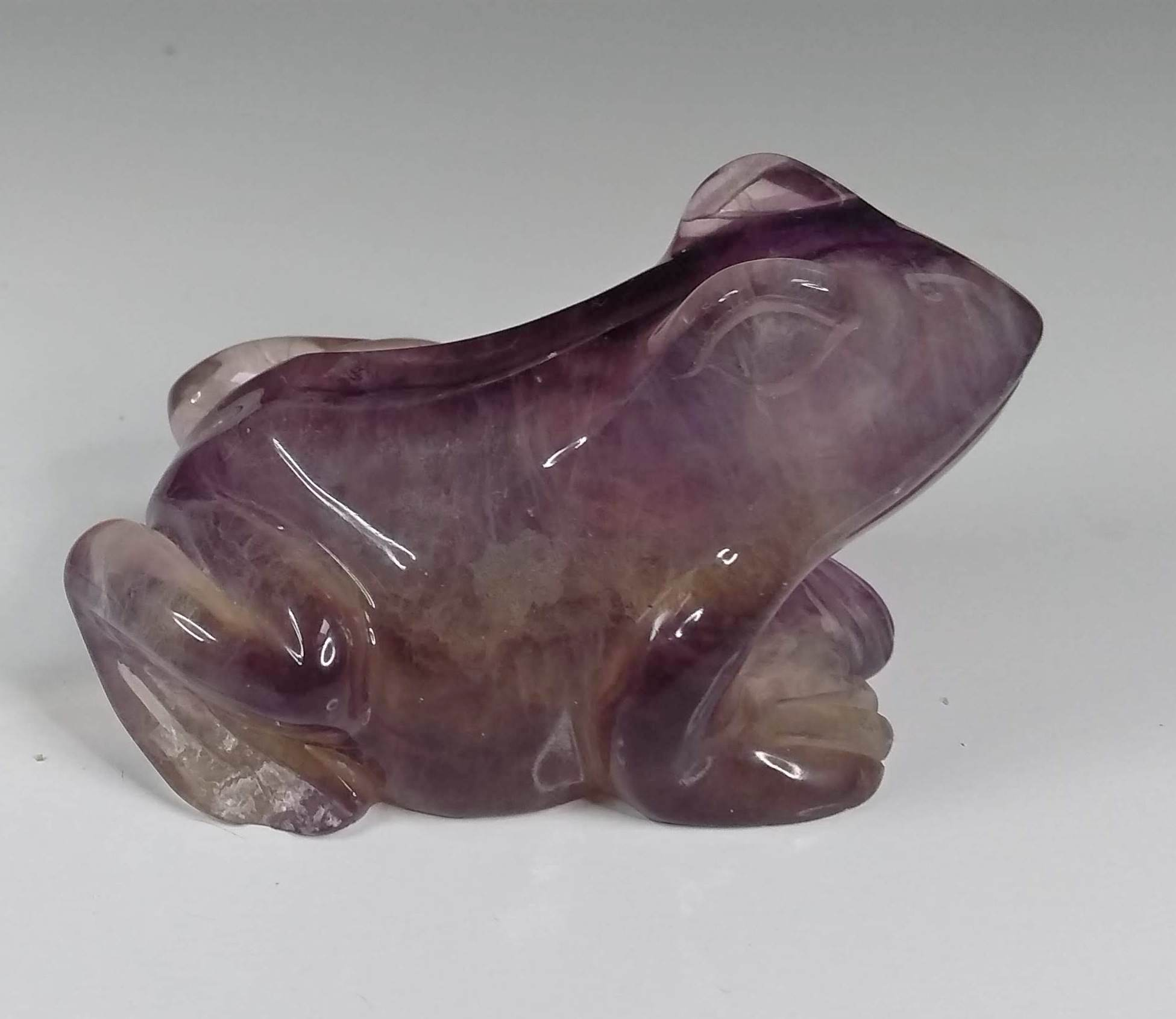
Toad carved in fluorite. Length 8 cm (3 in).

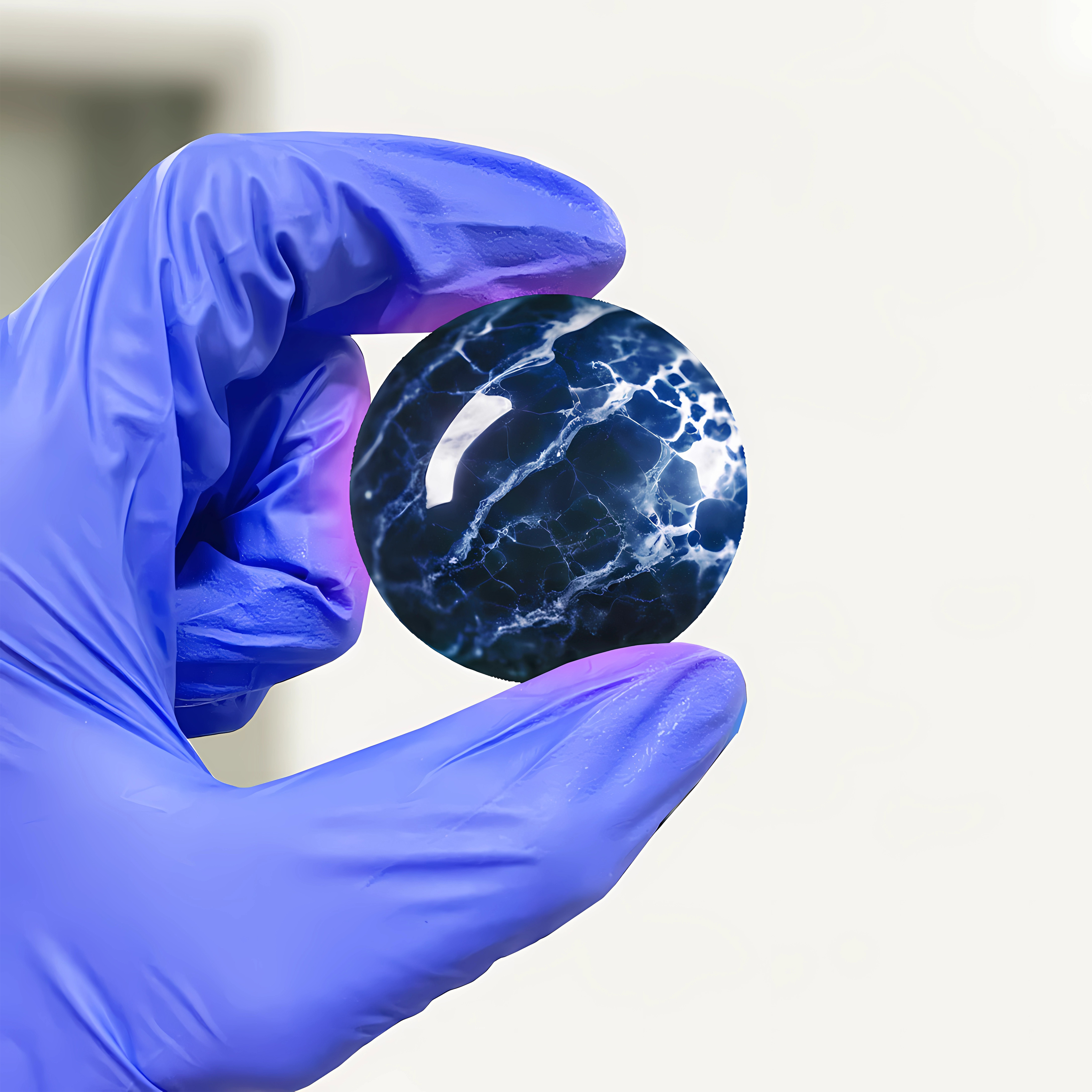
Sample of a spherically carved and polished fluorite via lapidary, a form commonly associated with decorative uses.

== See also ==
- List of countries by fluorite production
- List of minerals
- Magnesium fluoride – also used in UV optics
