= San Esteban, Ribadesella =

Coordinates: 43.48°N 5.13°W

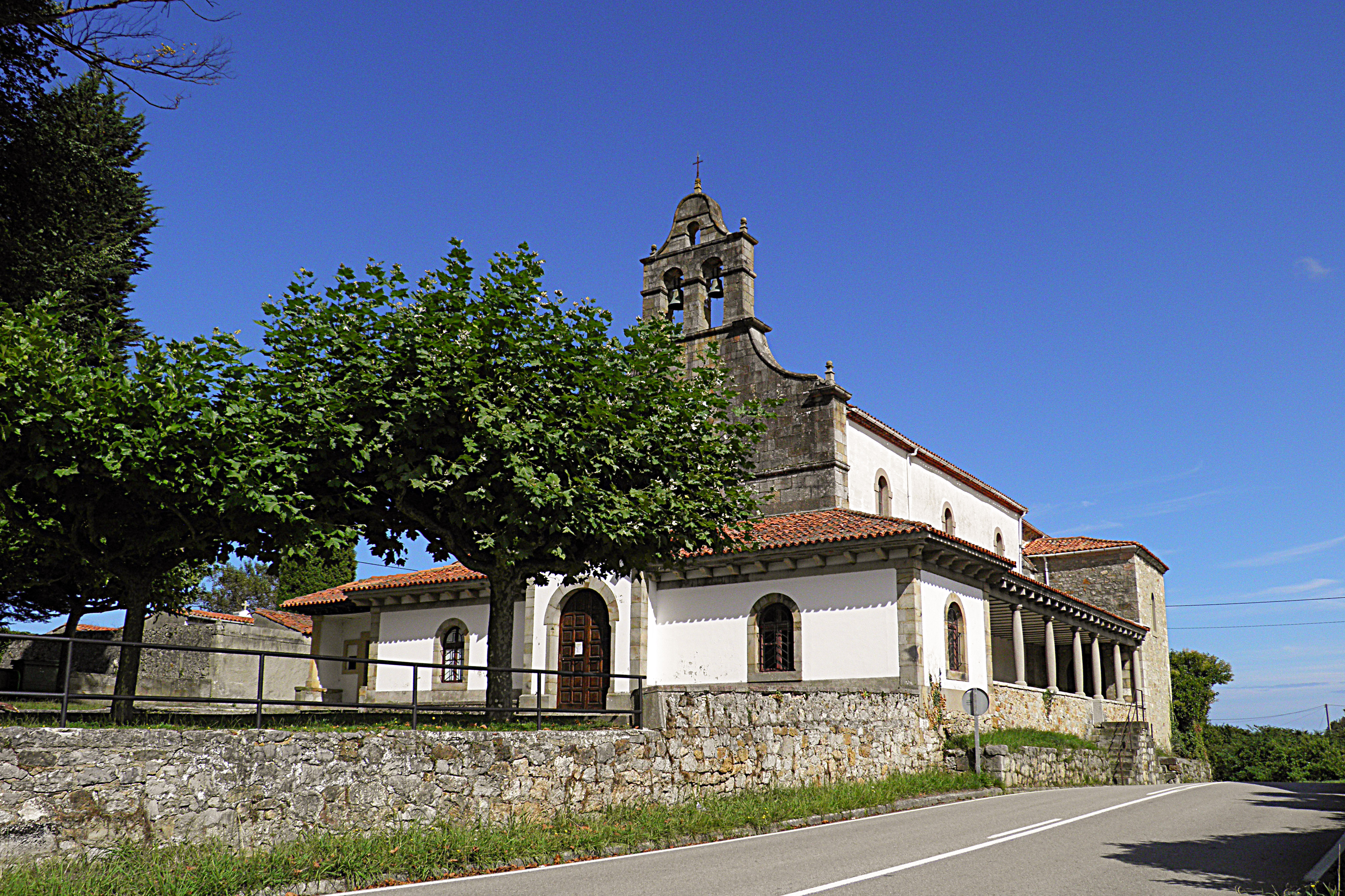

San Esteban (Spanish: Leces) is one of nine parishes (administrative divisions) in Ribadesella, a municipality within the province and autonomous community of Asturias, in northern Spain.

It is 85.97 km^{2} (33.19 sq mi) in size, with a population of 1,164 (INE 2007).

== Villages ==
- Abéu
- Barréu
- Bones
- Pandu
- San Esteban
- San Pedru
- Tereñes
- Torre
- Vega
