= Collera =

Parish in Asturias, Spain

Coordinates: 43.45°N 5.04°W

Collera is one of nine parishes (administrative divisions) in Ribadesella, a municipality within the province and autonomous community of Asturias, in northern Spain. It is 32.44 km^{2} (12.53 sq mi) in size, with a population of 745 (INE 2006).

== Villages ==
- Camangu
- Collera
- Cuerres
- Meluerda
- Torriellu
