= Berbes =

Parish in Ribadesella, Asturias, Spain

Coordinates: 43.47°N 5.15°W

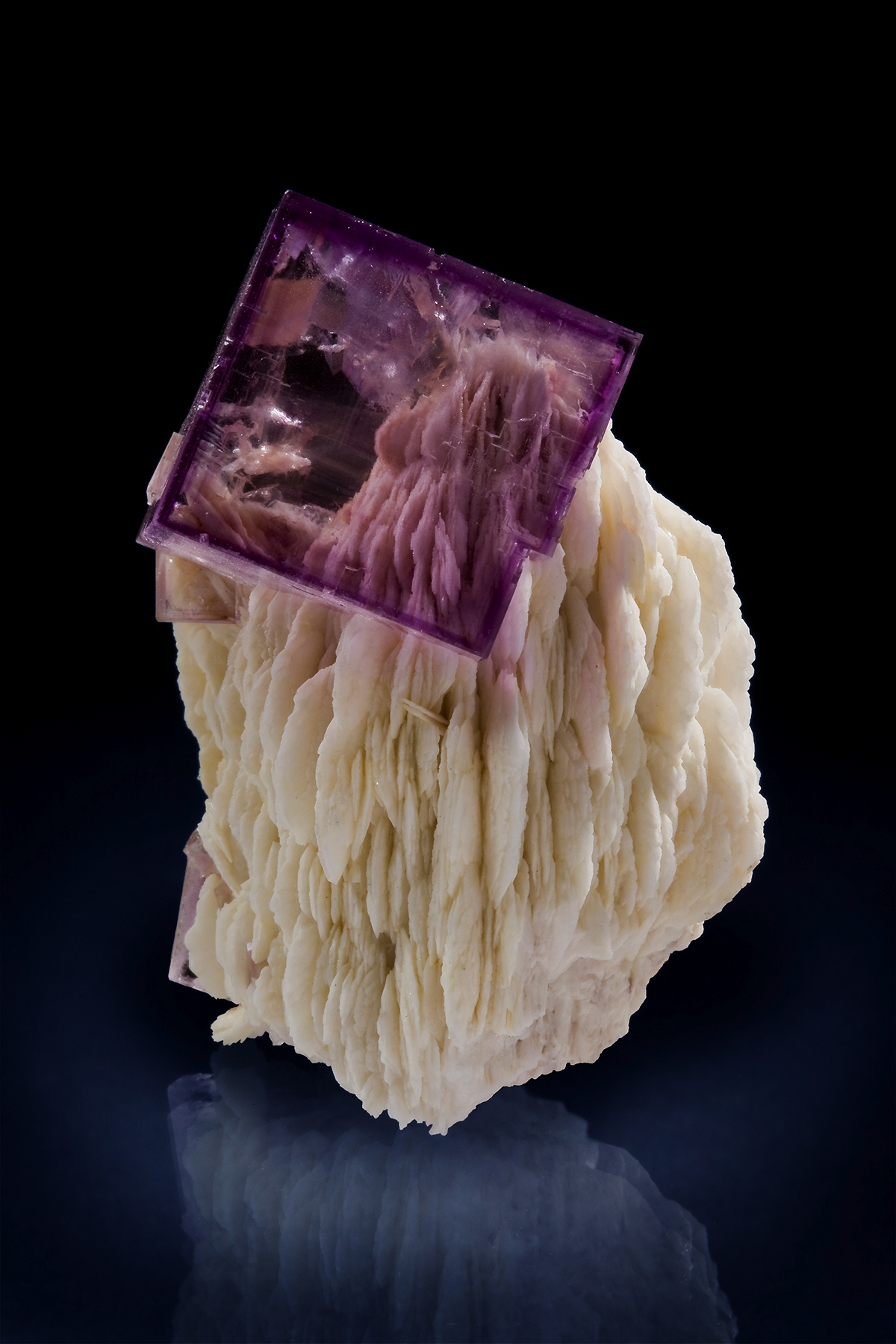
Fluorite on Barite, Berbes Mine, Berbes Parish.

Berbes is one of nine parishes (administrative divisions) in Ribadesella, a municipality within the province and autonomous community of Asturias, in northern Spain.

It is 32.44 km^{2} (12.53 sq mi) in size, with a population of 97 people (INE 2006).
