= International Sella River Descent =

Canoening competition in Asturias, Spain

International Sella River Descent Descenso Internacional del Sella
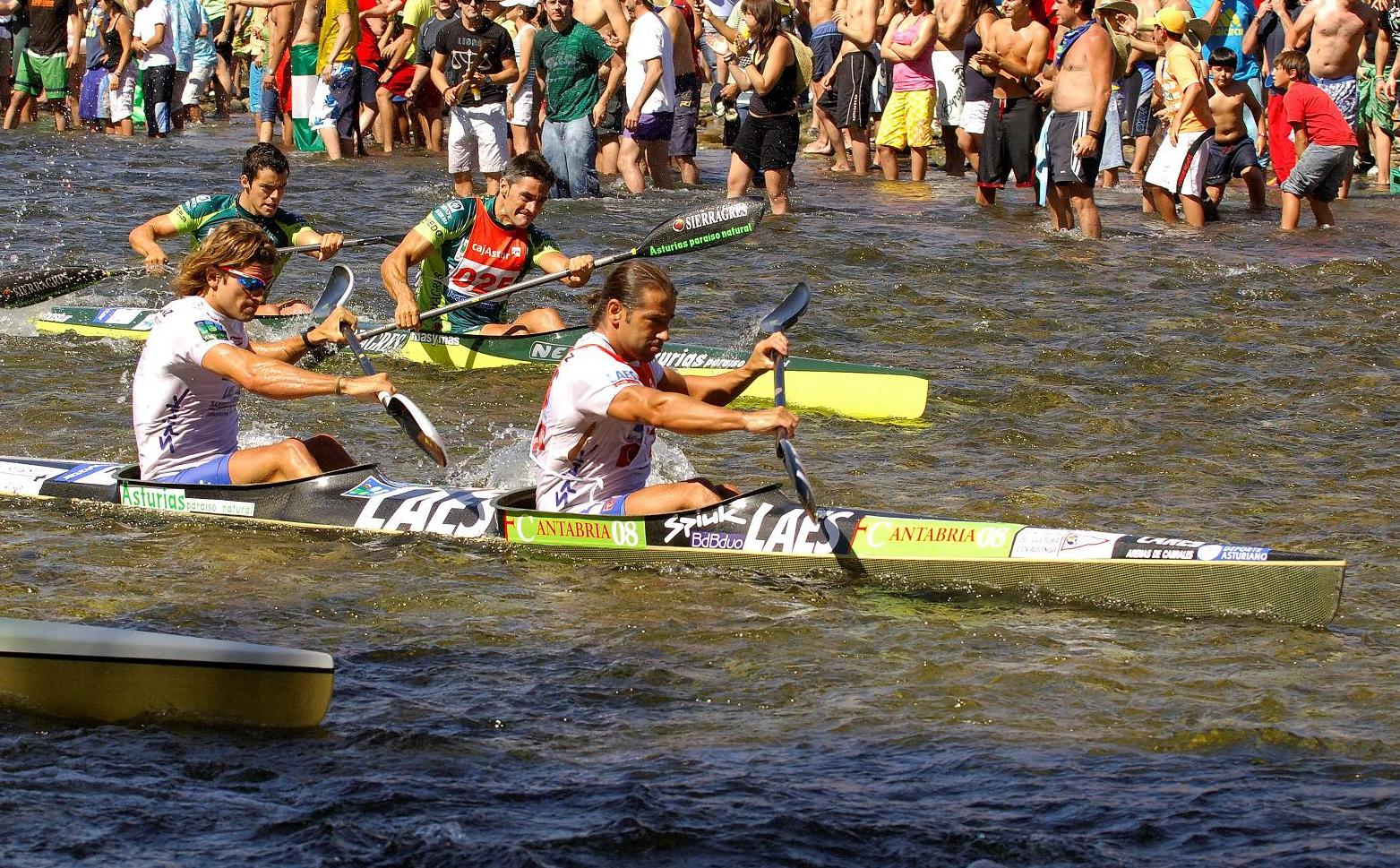
- Descent in 2008
- Nickname: Fiesta de las Piraguas
- Genre: Sport
- Date: Saturday following 2 August
- Frequency: Annual
- Locations: Arriondas-Ribadesella, Spain
- Inaugurated: 1930

Fiesta of International Tourist Interest
- Designated: 1980

The International Sella River Descent (Spanish: Descenso Internacional del Sella, popularly known as Fiesta de las Piraguas) is a 20 km (12 mi) canoeing and kayaking race that has been held since 1930 (Note: Except for 1936–1943 due to the Spanish Civil War and 2020–2021 due to the COVID-19 pandemic.) on the Saturday following 2 August along the Sella River between Arriondas and Ribadesella (Asturias), Spain.

Organized by the Comité Organizador del Descenso Internacional del Sella (CODIS) on behalf of the Real Federación Española de Piragüismo, it holds the honorary distinction of Fiesta of International Tourist Interest since 1980. In the 2023 edition, more than 1,100 paddlers and 800 boats from 18 countries participated in the competition, which attracted over 250,000 spectators.

For the occasion, and since 1945, Renfe (or its precessors) makes a train available for the fans, named Tren fluvial or Tren de las piraguas, which, starting from Arriondas, runs parallel to the Sella River, with stops at different points to get off to take a closer look at the race.
