= Santianes del Agua =

Parish (parroquia) in Ribadesella, Asturias, Spain

Coordinates: 43.43°N 5.06°W

Santianes del Agua is one of nine parishes (administrative divisions) in Ribadesella, a municipality within the province and autonomous community of Asturias, in northern Spain.

It is 14.45 km^{2} (5.58 sq mi) in size, with a population of 171 (INE 2006).

== Villages ==
- Lloviu
- Fríes
- Omedina
- Santianes
