= Moru, Ribadesella =

Parish in Ribadesella, Asturias, Spain

Coordinates: 43.45°N 5.11°W

Moru is one of nine parishes (administrative divisions) in Ribadesella, a municipality within the province and autonomous community of Asturias, in northern Spain.

It has an area of 30.67 km^{2} (11.84 sq mi), with a population of 288 (INE 2006).

== Villages ==
- El Carme
- Fresnu
- La Granda
- Nocéu
- Sardéu
- Sotu
- Tezangos
- Tresmonte
