= Antozonite =

Variant of fluorite (CaF2)

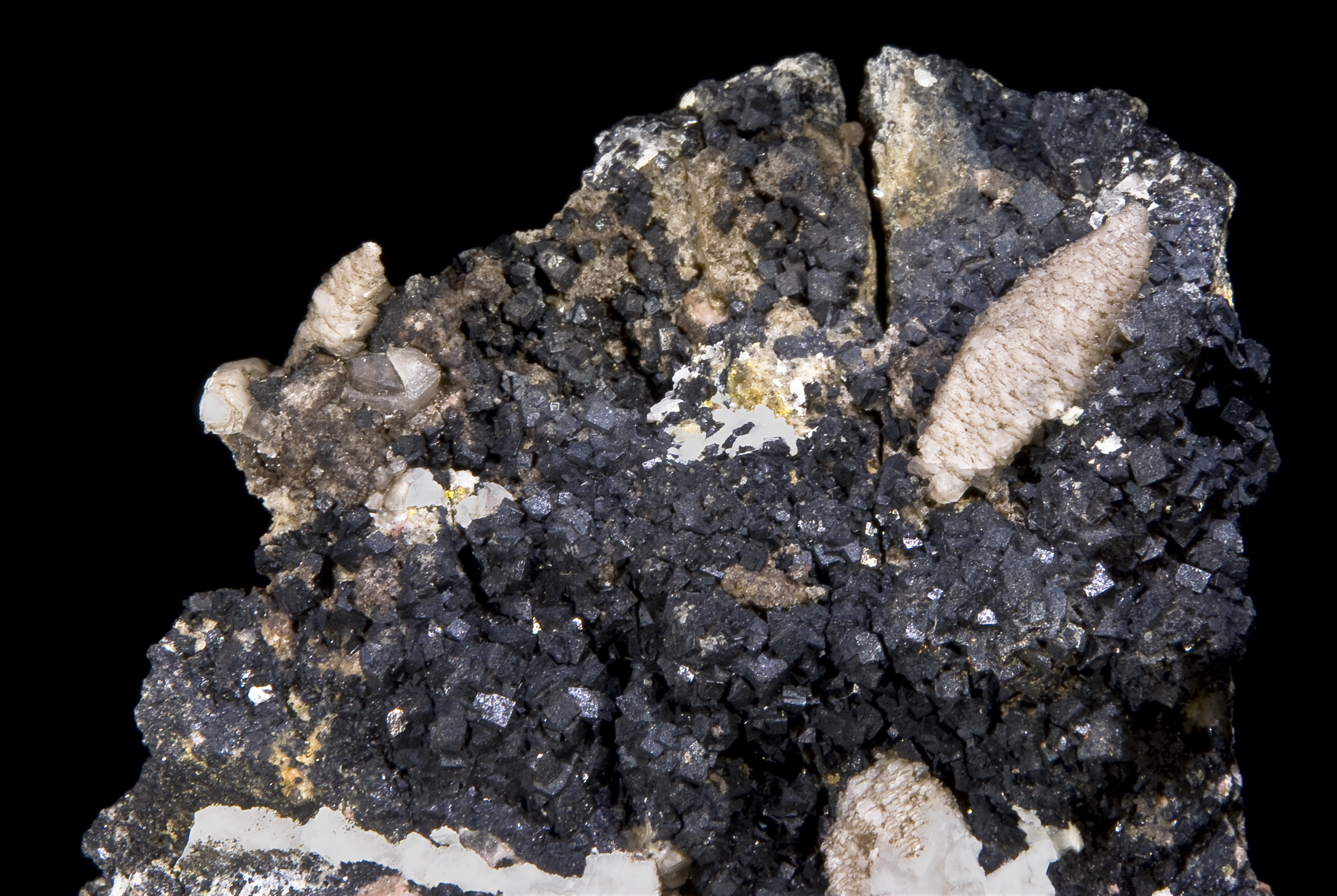
Antozonite with calcite from the Margnac Mine, Compreignac, Haute-Vienne, Limousin, France - (6x5.5cm)

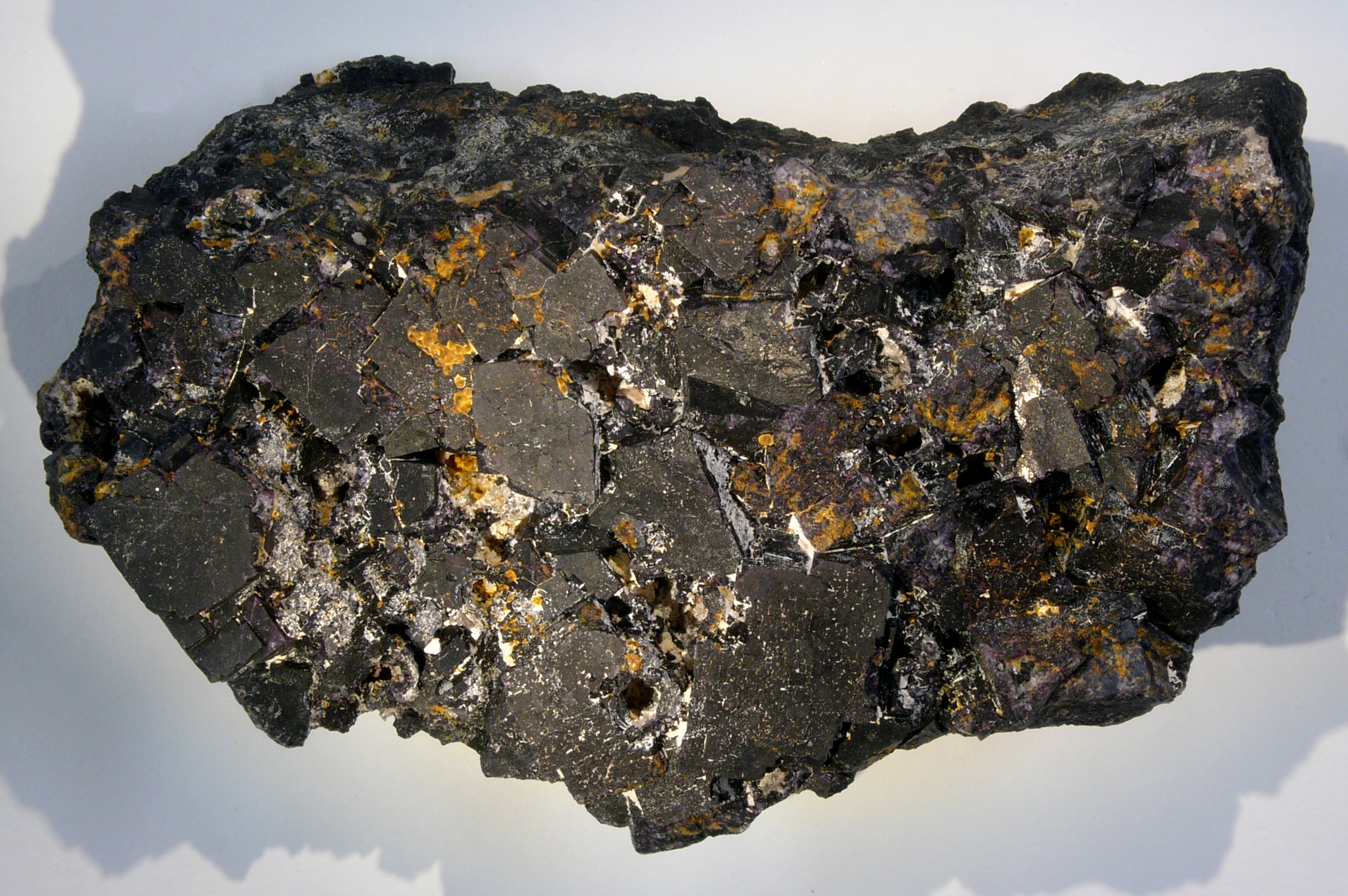
Fluorite (antozonite) from Wölsendorf, Oberpfalz, Southern Germany

Antozonite (historically known as Stinkspat, Stinkfluss, Stinkstein, Stinkspar and fetid fluorite) is a radioactive fluorite variety first found in Wölsendorf, Bavaria, in 1841, and named in 1862.

It is characterized by the presence of multiple inclusions containing elemental fluorine; when the crystals are crushed or broken, the elemental fluorine is released. It was postulated that beta radiation given by uranium inclusions continuously break down calcium fluoride into calcium and fluorine atoms. Fluorine atoms combine to produce difluoride anions and, upon losing the extra electrons at a defect, fluorine is formed. Fluorine subsequently reacts with atmospheric oxygen and water vapor, producing ozone (whose characteristic smell, originally mistaken for a hypothetical substance called antozone, is responsible for the mineral's name) and hydrogen fluoride.
