= Ribadesella =

- Municipality
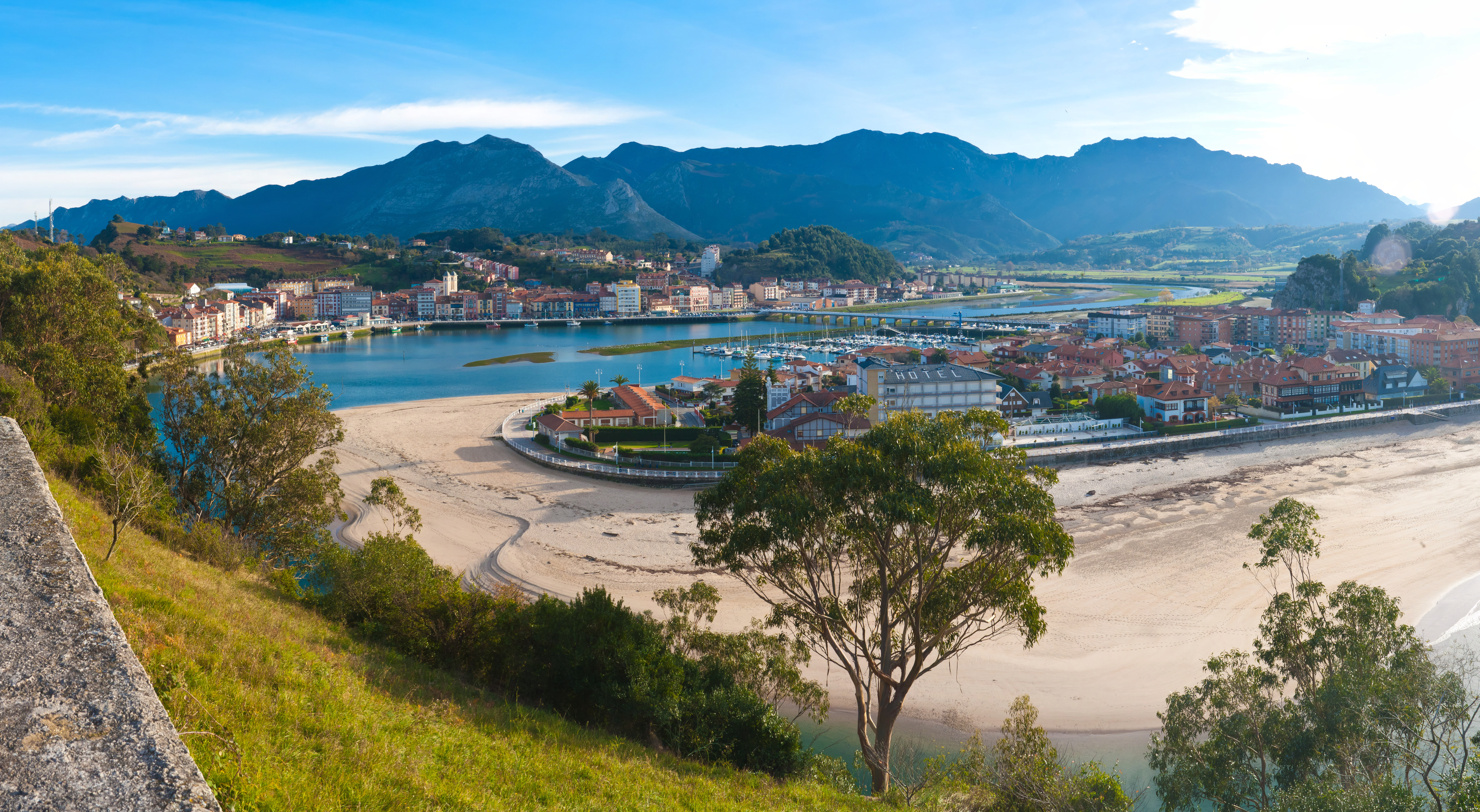

- Flag Coat of arms

- Location of Ribadesella

- Location in Spain
- Coordinates: 43°27′45″N 5°3′30″W
- Country: Spain
- Autonomous community: Asturias
- Province: Asturias
- Comarca: Oriente
- Capital: Ribadesella

Government
  - Alcalde: Ramón Manuel Canal Tirador (PSOE)

Area
  - Total: 84.37 km^{2} (32.58 sq mi)
- Elevation: 897 m (2,943 ft)

Population (2025-01-01)
  - Total: 5,591
  - Density: 66.27/km^{2} (171.6/sq mi)
- Demonym: riosellano
- Time zone: UTC+1 (CET)
  - Summer (DST): UTC+2 (CEST)
- Postal code: 33560
- Official language(s): Asturian
- Website: Official website

Ribadesella (Asturian: Ribeseya) is a small 84-square-kilometre (32 mi^{2}) municipality in the Autonomous Community of the Principality of Asturias, Spain. Known for its location on the Cantabrian Sea, at the outlet of the River Sella, Ribadesella is located near the Picos de Europa and serves as a gateway to the region. It is bordered on the east by Llanes, on the south by Cangas de Onís and Parres, and on the west by Caravia. Queen Letizia of Spain has family ties to Ribadesella, although she was born in Oviedo.

On the first weekend of August, the International Sella River Descent takes place; kayakers from all over the world gather here to attempt the final 20 kilometres (12.4 miles) of the Sella River in record time. The town is also known for its prehistoric cave, known as the Cave of Tito Bustillo, which is open to visitors during scheduled seasons and with limited access. Ribadesella is often visited for its history, sport activities, scenery, natural amenities, and food.

== History ==
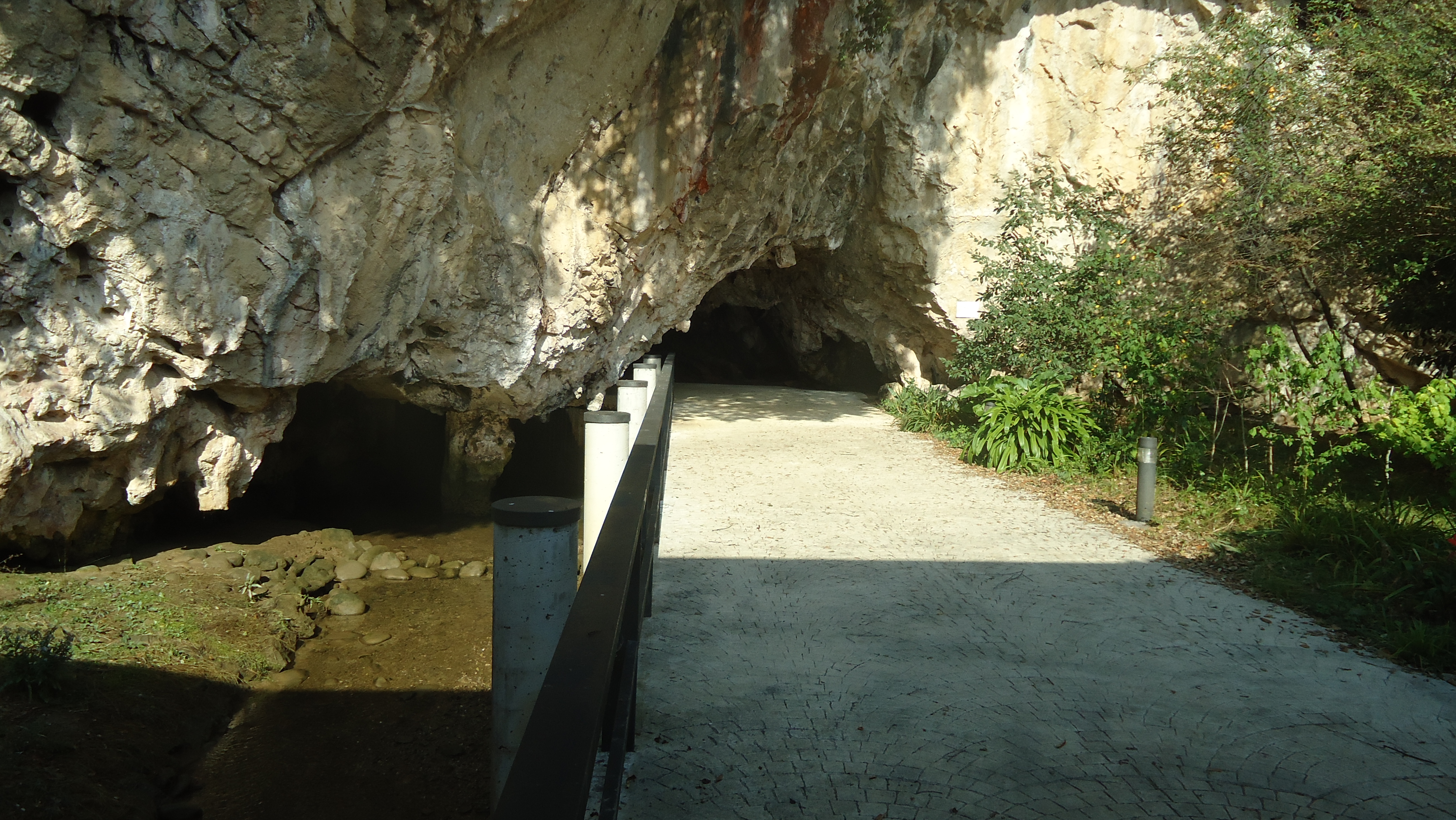
Tito Bustillo cave

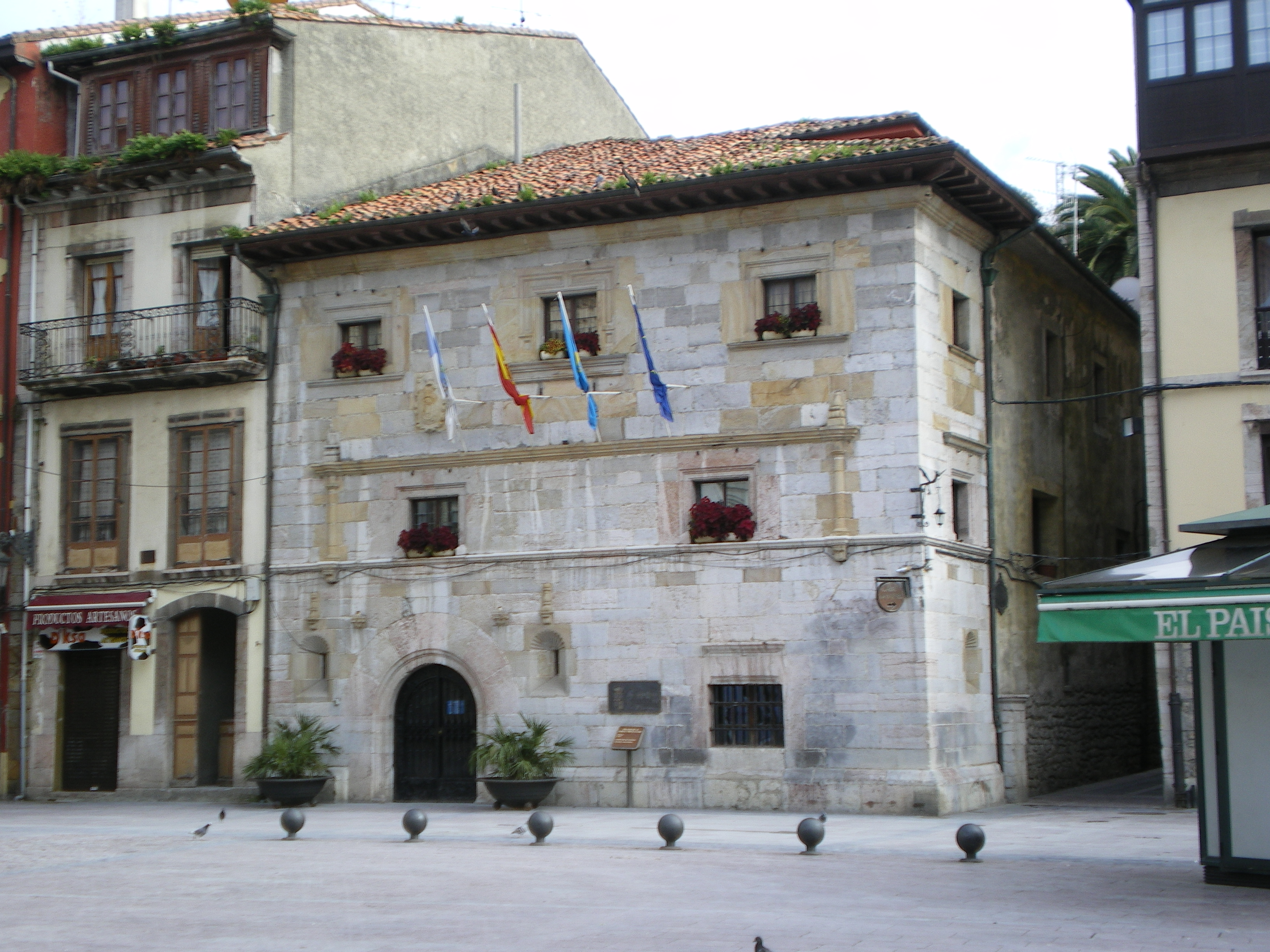
Prieto Palace

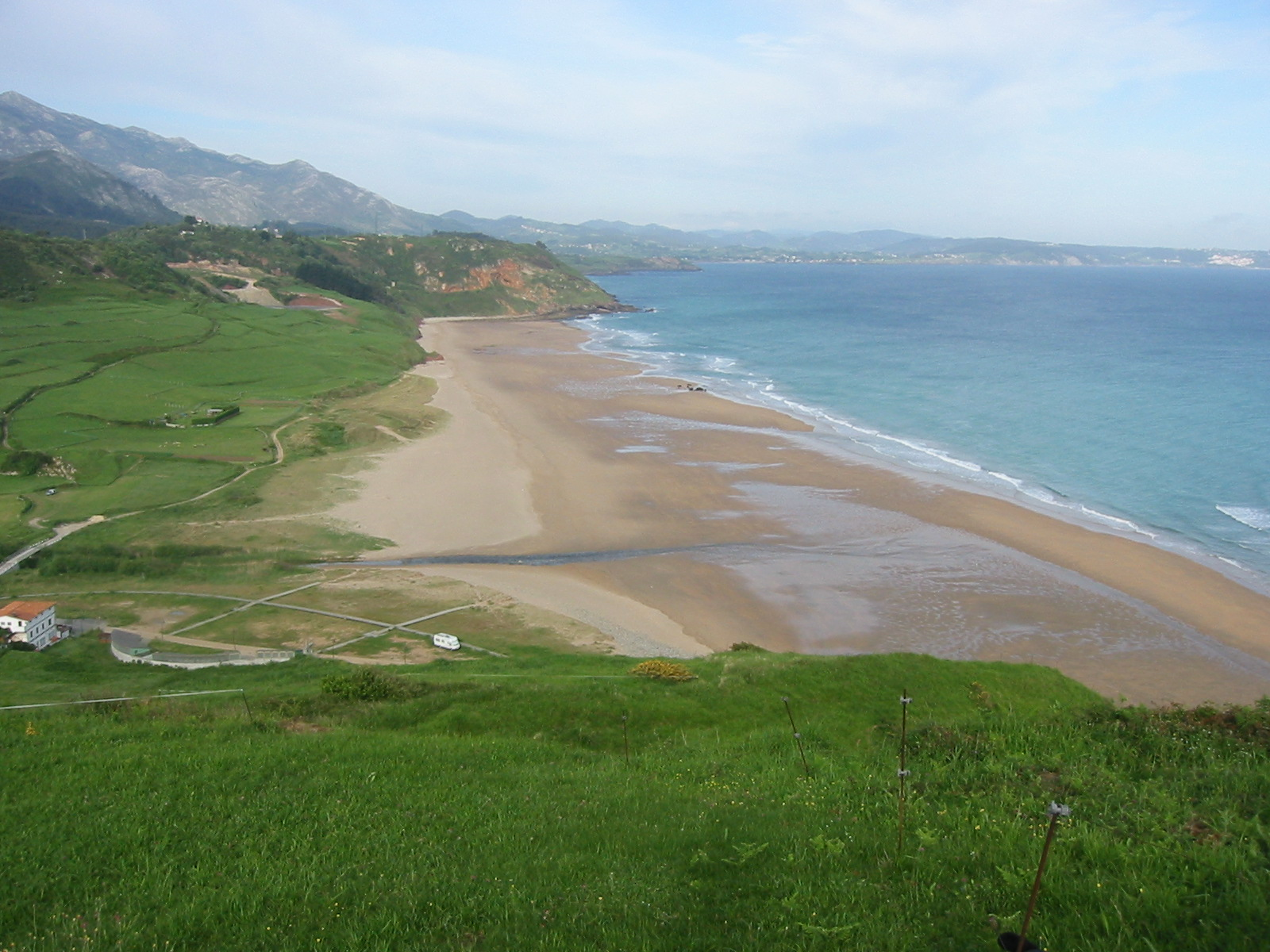
Vega beach

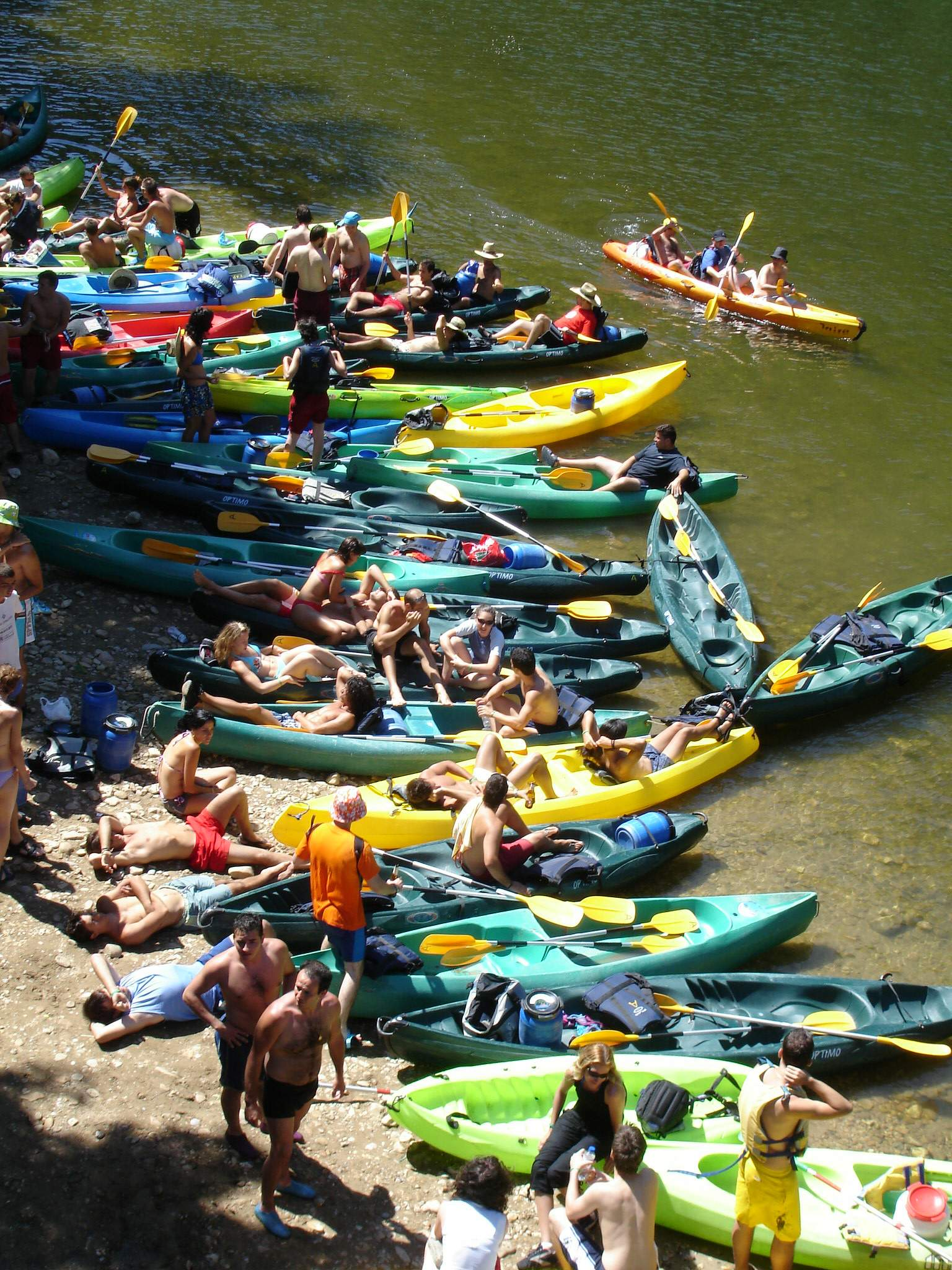
Sella Descent

The municipality includes the Tito Bustillo Cave (Cueva de Tito Bustillo), known for prehistoric wall paintings of animals and figures, probably dating from the Magdalenian age (29,000 years ago). It's included in the Unesco World Heritage Site Paleolithic Cave Art of Northern Spain.

The first written references to the settlement are more recent, and date from the first century BC. These come from the Greek geographer Strabo, who speaks of the River "Noega" separating "the Astures from the Cantabrians". The people of Ribadesella at this time were called the Salaeni: they dominated Colunga, Arriondas and Llanes.

== The town ==
Ribadesella has two main streets, the Gran Vía de Agustín Argüelles, and the Calle Comercio. In this part of Ribadesella, there are a few banks, pharmacies, restaurants/bars, stores, and newspaper stands. Here also is the Casco Antiguo, where the old plaza is located, as well as Ribadesella's church: the Iglesia Parroquial de Sta. María Magdalena. In this part of town are small shops selling homemade products, as well as the homes of Ribadesella's inhabitants. The third part of Ribadesella consists of the Paseo Marítimo del Puerto, or the Maritime Avenue of the Port.

== Parishes ==
- Berbes
- Collera
- Xuncu
- Leces
- Linares
- Moro
- Ribadesella (Capital)
- Santianes
- Ucio

== Cultural events ==
The International Sella River Descent is a race that takes place every year on the first weekend of August on the banks of the River Sella, and is accompanied by a celebratory gathering (La Fiesta de Les Piragües) through the streets and plaza of Ribadesella. The race begins in Arriondas, and finishes at the end of the River Sella, located in the “center” of Ribadesella.

Other festivals are celebrated with food, music, and dancing with original bagpipe/asturiano music and traditional dress. These festivals include religious celebrations for San Antón de Cuerres, San José de Sebreñu, Nuestra Señora de Fátima de Toriellu, San Isidro, San Lorenzo, Nuestra Señora de la Asunción, Nuestra Señora de la Esperanza de Collera, and Nuestra Señora de Guía, the patron of fishermen. The Feria del Queso (Cheese Festival) de Cuerres and La Fiesta del Pez (Fish Festival) de Tereñes are other festivals celebrated throughout Ribadesella. Semana Santa, or Easter Week is very important in Ribadesella. Processions take place daily, and a great celebration, including a horse race/spectacular on the Santa Marina beach is held each year.

== See also ==
- List of municipalities in Asturias
