= List of lens designs =

This list covers optical lens designs grouped by tasks or overall type. The field of optical lens designing has many variables including the function the lens or group of lenses have to perform, the limits of optical glass because of the index of refraction and dispersion properties, and design constraints including realistic lens element center and edge thicknesses, minimum and maximum air-spaces between lenses, maximum constraints on entrance and exit angles, and even cost. Some lenses listed are overall types with sub-designs (as noted).

== Simple lens designs ==
Simple lenses are lenses consisting of a single element. Lenses in this section may overlap with lens designs in other sections, for example the Wollaston landscape lens is a single element and also a camera lens design.

Basic types

- Biconcave lens
- Biconvex lens
- Convex-concave lens
- Plano concave lens
- Plano convex lens
- Meniscus lens

Designs

- Wollaston landscape lens

== Achromatic lens designs ==
There are many compound designs of achromatic lenses, designed to reduce color-related distortion (Chromatic aberration):

- Achromatic doublet (type)
  - Littrow doublet
  - Fraunhofer doublet
  - Clark doublet
  - Oil-spaced doublet
  - Steinheil doublet
  - Apochromatic doublet
- Dialyte lens
- Superachromat

== Camera lens designs ==
Camera lenses use a wide variety of designs because of the need to balance and trade off different requirements: angle of view (i.e. focal length in relation to the film or sensor size), maximum aperture, resolution, distortion, color correction, back focal distance, and cost.

- Celor lens
- Chevalier lens
- Cooke Triplet
- Double-Gauss lens
- Frazier lens
- Fresnel lens
- Gauss lens
- Inverted telephoto (retrofocus) lens
- Petzval lens
- Plasmat lens
- Telephoto lens
- Tessar lens
- Wollaston landscape lens

== Eyepiece designs ==
An eyepiece, a type of (usually a compound) lens that attaches to optical devices such as telescopes and microscopes, comes in many designs:

- Convex
- Galilean
- Huygens
- Ramsden
- Kellner or "Achromat"
- Plössl or "Symmetrical"
- Orthoscopic or "Abbe"
- Monocentric
- Erfle
- König
- RKE
- Nagler
