= Sigma 60-600mm f/4.5-6.3 DG OS HSM lens =

60-600mm f/4.5-6.3 DG
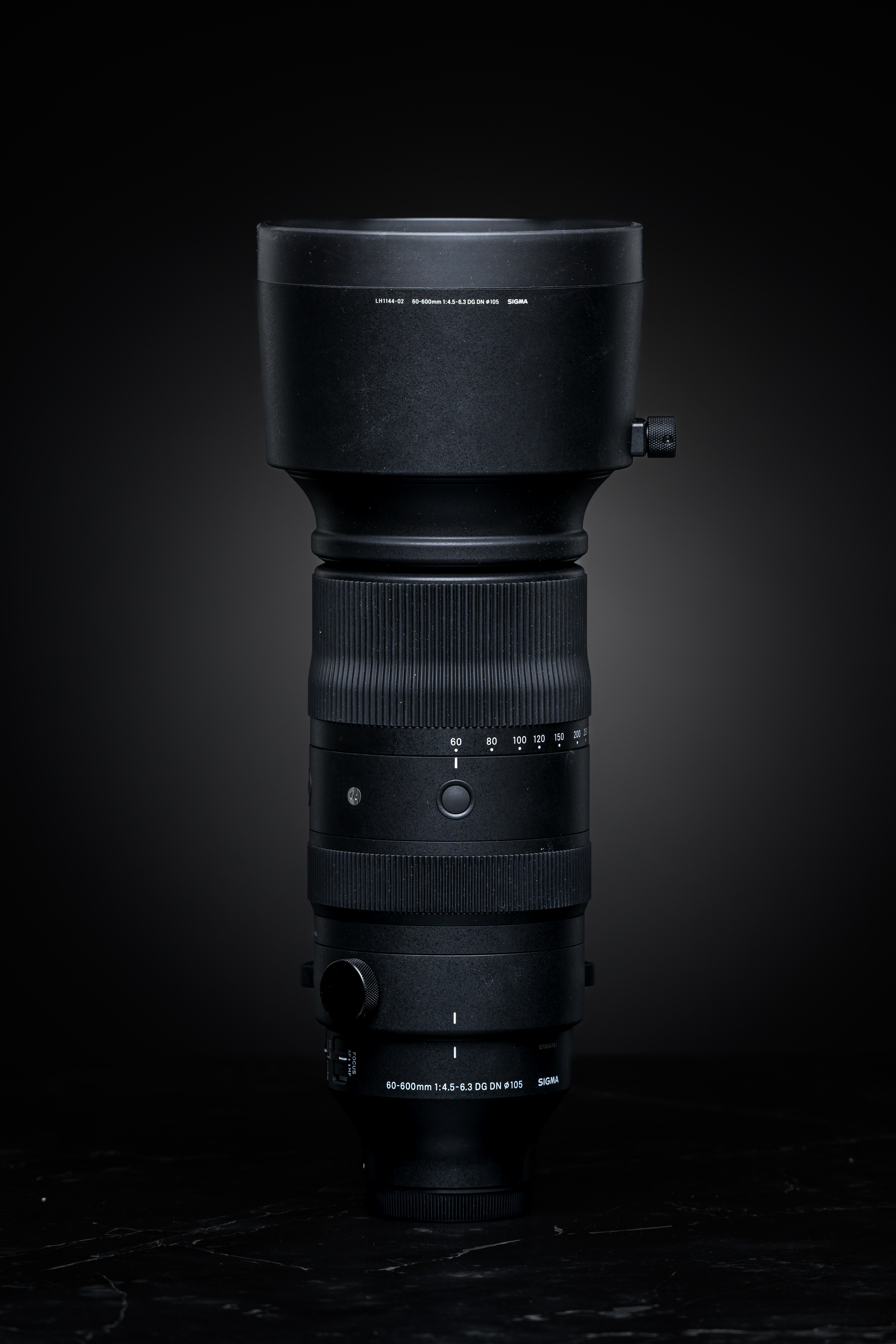
- Maker: Sigma

Technical data
- Type: Telephoto zoom
- Focal length: 60–600 mm
- Crop factor: 1.0
- Aperture (max/min): f/4.5~6.3-f/22~32
- Close focus distance: 45–260 cm (18–102 in)
- Max. magnification: 1:2.4/3.3
- Diaphragm blades: 9
- Construction: 25/27 elements in 19 groups

Features
- Short back focus: No No
- Ultrasonic motor: Yes Yes
- Lens-based stabilization: Yes Yes
- Macro capable: No No

Physical
- Max. length: 268.9–281.2 mm (10.59–11.07 in)
- Diameter: 119.4–120.4 mm (4.70–4.74 in)
- Weight: 2,485–2,700 g (87.7–95.2 oz)
- Filter diameter: 105 mm

Retail info
- MSRP: 1999 USD

The Sigma 60-600mm f/4.5-6.3 DG lens is a super-telephoto zoom lens produced by Sigma Corporation since 2018. It succeeds an earlier 10× zoom lens (50–500mm) which was introduced by Sigma in 2000 and is commonly known as the "Bigma". It is aimed at advanced consumers. The 60–600mm lens is produced in two versions: one exclusively for single lens reflex cameras, with Canon EF mount, Nikon F mount, and Sigma SA mount versions, named the 60–600mm F4.5-6.3 DG OS HSM | S, and one exclusively for mirrorless cameras, in Leica L-Mount and Sony E-mount versions, named the 60–600mm F4.5-6.3 DG DN OS | S.

== Versions ==
Release Feature	60-600mm F4.5-6.3 DG OS HSM | S (2018)	60-600MM F4.5-6.3 DG DN OS | S (2023)
Focal length	60~600 mm	
Aperture	f/4.5~6.3 [to f/22~32]	
AF motor	HSM (ultrasonic ring)	HLA (linear)
Construction	25e/19g 1 SLD, 3 FLD	27e/19g 3 SLD, 2 FLD
Min. focus dist.	60–260 cm (23.6–102.4 in)	45–260 cm (17.7–102.4 in)
Max. mag.	1:3.3 (at f=200 mm)	1:2.4 (at f=200 mm)
Filter (mm)	105	
Dims. (Φ×L)	120.4 mm × 268.9 mm (4.74 in × 10.59 in)	119.4 mm × 281.2 mm (4.70 in × 11.07 in)
Wgt.	2,700 g (95 oz)	2,485–2,495 g (87.7–88.0 oz)
Mounts	Sigma SA, Nikon (AF-D), Canon EF	Leica L, Sony E
SKU	730	732

The acronyms used by Sigma designate the following features:

- DG = digital-specific coatings
- DN = mirrorless camera
- OS = optical image stabilization
- HSM = hypersonic motor
- S = "sports" line

The SLR-specific version was released in 2018 and can be used with mirrorless cameras via adapters. According to Yasuhiro Ohsone, head of product planning at Sigma, it was developed as a successor to the company's earlier 50-500mm lens. The weight of the 60–600mm lens was reduced by 20% during its development with innovative materials: the mount and tripod attachment use magnesium alloy, the focusing and zoom rings use carbon fiber reinforced plastic, and the internal cams use thermally stable composite materials.

Sigma released a mirrorless-specific version in 2023. Compared to the older lens, the updated version has reduced weight and minimum focus distance, and increased focusing speed.

== See also ==
- List of Nikon F-mount lenses with integrated autofocus motors
- Sigma 200–500mm f/2.8 EX DG lens
- Sigma 300–800mm f/5.6 EX DG HSM lens (a.k.a. the Sigmonster)
