= Sigma 50-500mm f/4-6.3 DG lens =

APO 50-500mm f/4-6.3 EX DG HSM
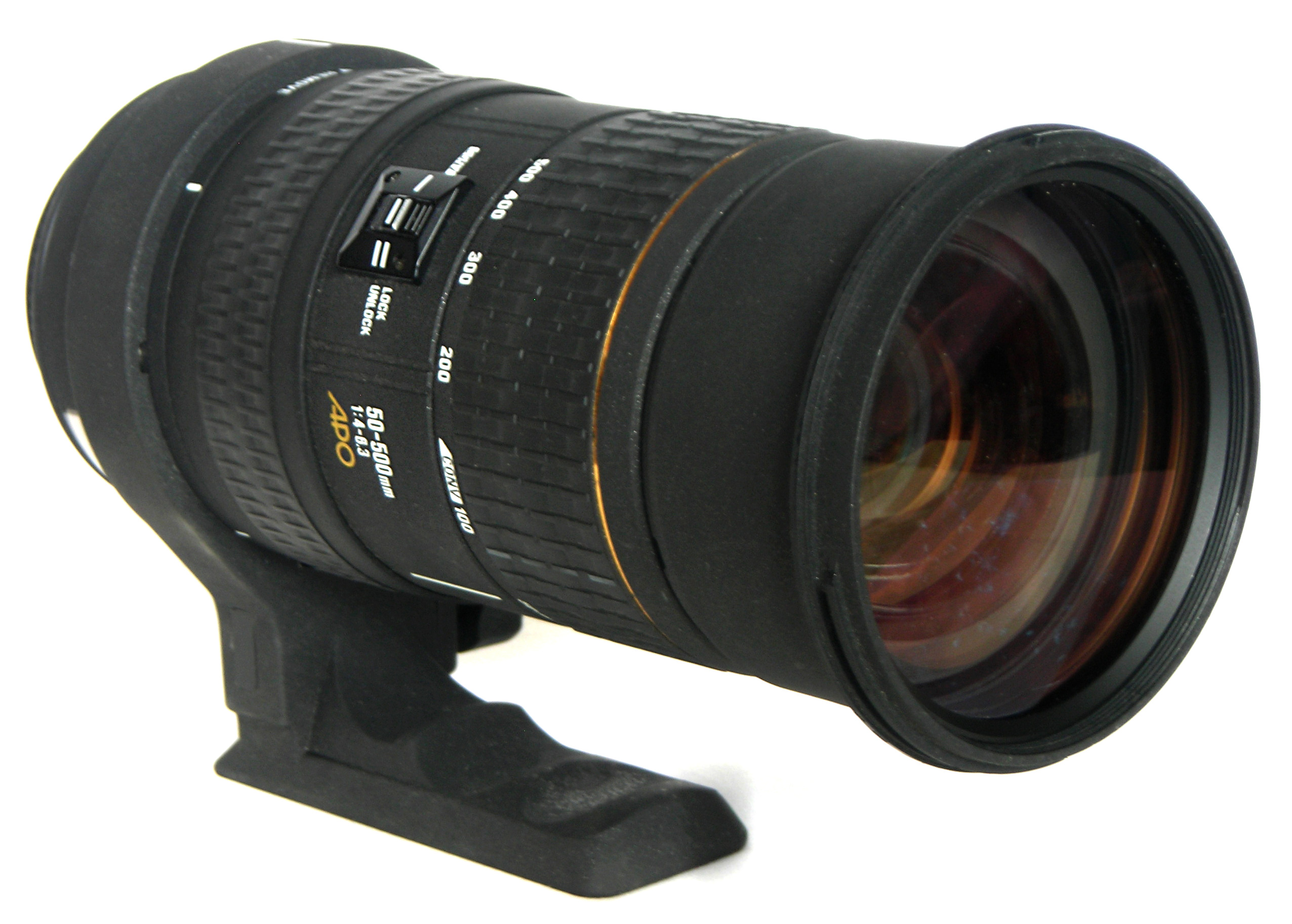
- Maker: Sigma

Technical data
- Type: Telephoto zoom
- Focal length: 50–500 mm
- Crop factor: 1.0
- Aperture (max/min): f/4-6.3-f/22
- Close focus distance: 100–300 cm
- Max. magnification: 1:5.2
- Diaphragm blades: 9
- Construction: 20 elements in 16 groups

Features
- Short back focus: No No
- Ultrasonic motor: Yes Yes
- Lens-based stabilization: No No
- Macro capable: No No

Physical
- Max. length: 218.5 mm
- Diameter: 95 mm
- Weight: 1840 g
- Filter diameter: 86 mm

Retail info
- MSRP: 1059.00 USD

The Sigma 50-500mm f/4-6.3 EX DG HSM is a super-telephoto zoom lens produced by Sigma Corporation. It contains four SLD (Special Low Dispersion) glass elements to provide correction for chromatic aberration. It is aimed at advanced consumers.

== Versions ==
The lens was originally announced by Sigma in 2000 at that year's Photo Expo and released in 2001. The lens has a variable minimum focusing distance and varifocal design, which was remedied partially through autofocusing technology.

Over the years, it has gone through several iterations and improvements. This includes the 2006 DG model which has upgraded coatings optimized for digital cameras. In 2010, Sigma added built-in optical stabilization (OS) to the lens.

Release Feature	AF 50-500mm F4-6.3 EX APO RF HSM (2001)	APO 50-500mm F4-6.3 EX DG HSM (2006)	50-500mm F4.5-6.3 APO DG OS HSM (2010)
Focal length	50~500 mm		
Aperture	f/4.0~6.3 [to f/22~36]		f/4.5~6.3
Construction	20e/16g (4 SLD)		22e/16g
Min. focus dist.	100, 300 cm (39.4, 118.1 in) [for f=50, 500 mm]		50–180 cm (19.7–70.9 in)
Max. mag.	1:5.2 (at f=200 mm)		1:3.1
Filter (mm)	86		95
Dims. (Φ×L)	94 mm × 216 mm (3.7 in × 8.5 in)	95 mm × 218.5 mm (3.74 in × 8.60 in)	104.4 mm × 219 mm (4.11 in × 8.62 in)
Wgt.	1,850 g (65 oz)	1,840 g (65 oz)	1,970 g (69 oz)
Mounts	Sigma SA, Minolta α, Pentax K(AF), Nikon (AF-D), Canon EF	Sigma SA, Minolta α, Pentax K(AF), Nikon (AF-D), Canon EF, 4/3	Sigma SA, Minolta α, Pentax K(AF), Nikon (AF-D), Canon EF

== See also ==
- List of Nikon F-mount lenses with integrated autofocus motors
- Sigma 60-600mm f/4.5-6.3 DG OS HSM lens
- Sigma 200–500mm f/2.8 EX DG lens
- Sigma 300–800mm f/5.6 EX DG HSM lens (a.k.a. the Sigmonster)
