= Low-dispersion glass =

Lens glass material with reduced refractive index shift with wavelength

Comparison of visible wavelength dispersion (i.e., the distance between foci for blue and red) of crown and flint glass converging lenses

Low-dispersion glass (LD glass) is a type of glass with reduced chromatic aberration, meaning the refractive index does not change as strongly with different wavelengths of light. In other words, the light passing through the glass has a smaller spread or dispersion between its constituent colors, resulting in a reduced "rainbow effect" at high-contrast edges. Wavelength dispersion in a certain material is characterized by its Abbe number; LD glass has a higher Abbe number than conventional types. Crown glass is an example of a relatively inexpensive low-dispersion glass.

== Branding ==
Abbe number versus refractive index for glass lens materials

Photographic lenses with LD glass have been branded and marketed with different names to indicate the use of low-dispersion elements in the optical design, including:

- Anomalous Dispersion (AD): Minolta
- Extra-low Dispersion or Extraordinary Dispersion (ED): Nikon, Olympus, Pentax
- Extraordinary Low Dispersion (ELD): Sigma
- Low Dispersion (LD): Tamron
- Super Low Dispersion (SD): Tokina
- Special Low Dispersion or Super Low Dispersion (SLD): Sigma
- Ultra-low Dispersion (UD): Canon

Some glasses may include a "Super" modifier (e.g., "Super ED") to designate materials with even lower wavelength dispersion characteristics.

There are no industry standards which determine whether a given material may be considered LD glass; the designation differs by manufacturer. Schott AG publishes a diagram of the glasses it manufactures, grouped by glass code, showing refractive index (y-axis) as a function of Abbe number (x-axis). Most classical crown and flint glasses follow a gentle curve on the right side of the chart, which demonstrates these classical glasses have an inverse dependence between refractive index and Abbe number. Lens materials to the left of those have a higher Abbe number for a given refractive index, and may be considered to be low-dispersion types, including many of the lanthanum-doped glasses.

== Applications ==
White light passing through a prism using conventional glass is dispersed into a rainbow because the refractive index is a function of wavelength.

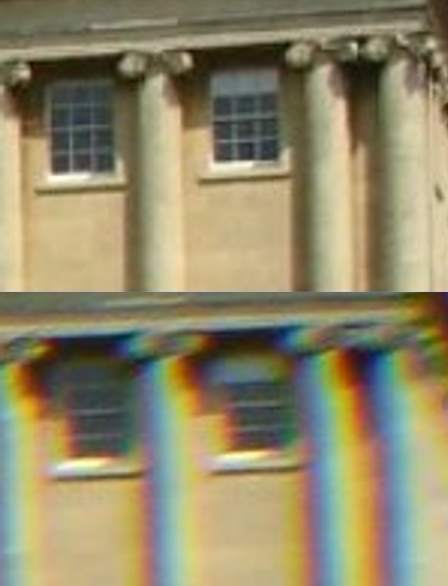
Chromatic aberration from inadequate correction to converge different wavelengths, giving a "rainbow effect" at high-contrast edges.

Diagram of an achromatic doublet: crown and flint glasses are used together to converge the red and blue wavelengths at a single focal point.

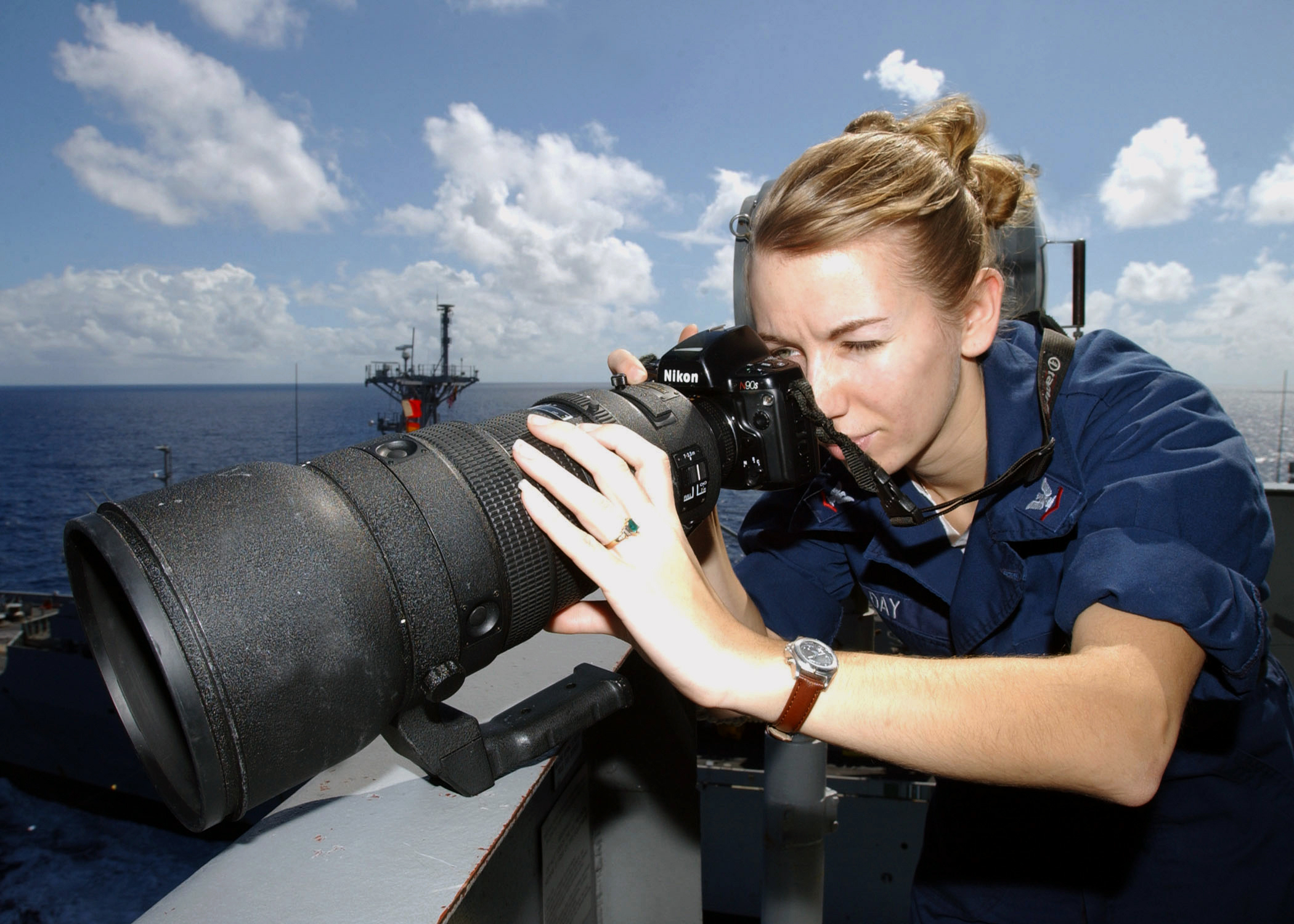
High-performance telephoto lenses often incorporate LD glass elements.

=== Imaging ===
Low-dispersion glasses are particularly used to reduce chromatic aberration, most often used in achromatic doublets. The positive element is made of a low-dispersion glass, the negative element from a high-dispersion glass. To counteract the effect of the negative lens, the positive lens has to be thicker. Achromatic doublets therefore have higher thickness and weight than the equivalent non-chromatic-corrected single lenses.

In comparison to telephoto lenses, shorter focal length objectives benefit less from low-dispersion elements, as their chief problem is spherical aberration rather than chromatic aberration. The spherical aberration introduced by the LD elements can be corrected with aspheric lens elements. The increased sharpness provided by SLD elements allows using lower f-numbers and therefore faster shutter speed. This is critical, e.g., in sports photography and wildlife photography. The shallow depth of field provided by a telephoto lens also allows the subject of the photography to stand out better against the background.

Infrared corrected special-low-dispersion glass also has benefits to CCTV cameras. The low chromatic aberration of SLD glass allows the lens to always stay in focus, from visible light to infrared.

=== Scientific ===
Low-dispersion glasses are also employed in handling ultrashort pulses of light, in e.g. mode-locked lasers, to prevent pulse broadening by group velocity dispersion in the optical elements.

=== Sport optics ===
In binoculars, ED glass, also sometimes referred to as a high density (HD) glass, is a high quality optical glass that increases light transmission, decreases light dispersion, and so cuts down on chromatic aberration, or "color fringing", which is due to the splitting of the light spectrum. It is used in binocular objective lenses to help focus the light waves of the color spectrum on the human eye, and to deliver bright, sharp images. ED lenses are composed of a specific formulation that contains rare-earth elements. However, there is no ED standard that dictates the materials that must be used in ED lenses. Therefore, the quality of ED glass can vary.

== History ==
This apochromatic triplet converges three wavelengths of light

Some glasses have a peculiar property called anomalous partial dispersion. Abnormal dispersion is required to design apochromatic lenses; in contrast to the achromatic doublets, which converge blue and red wavelengths, apochromats converge focus of three or more wavelengths.

=== Rare earth and radioactive lenses ===
Thoriated glass is doped with thorium dioxide, resulting in a lens material with high refractive index and low dispersion, suitable for apochromatic designs. Thoriated glass was in use before World War II, but not widely used until the 1950s. Because thorium is radioactive, optical engineers and designers sought a replacement using different doping elements, and lens designs using thoriated glass been discontinued by the late 1980s.

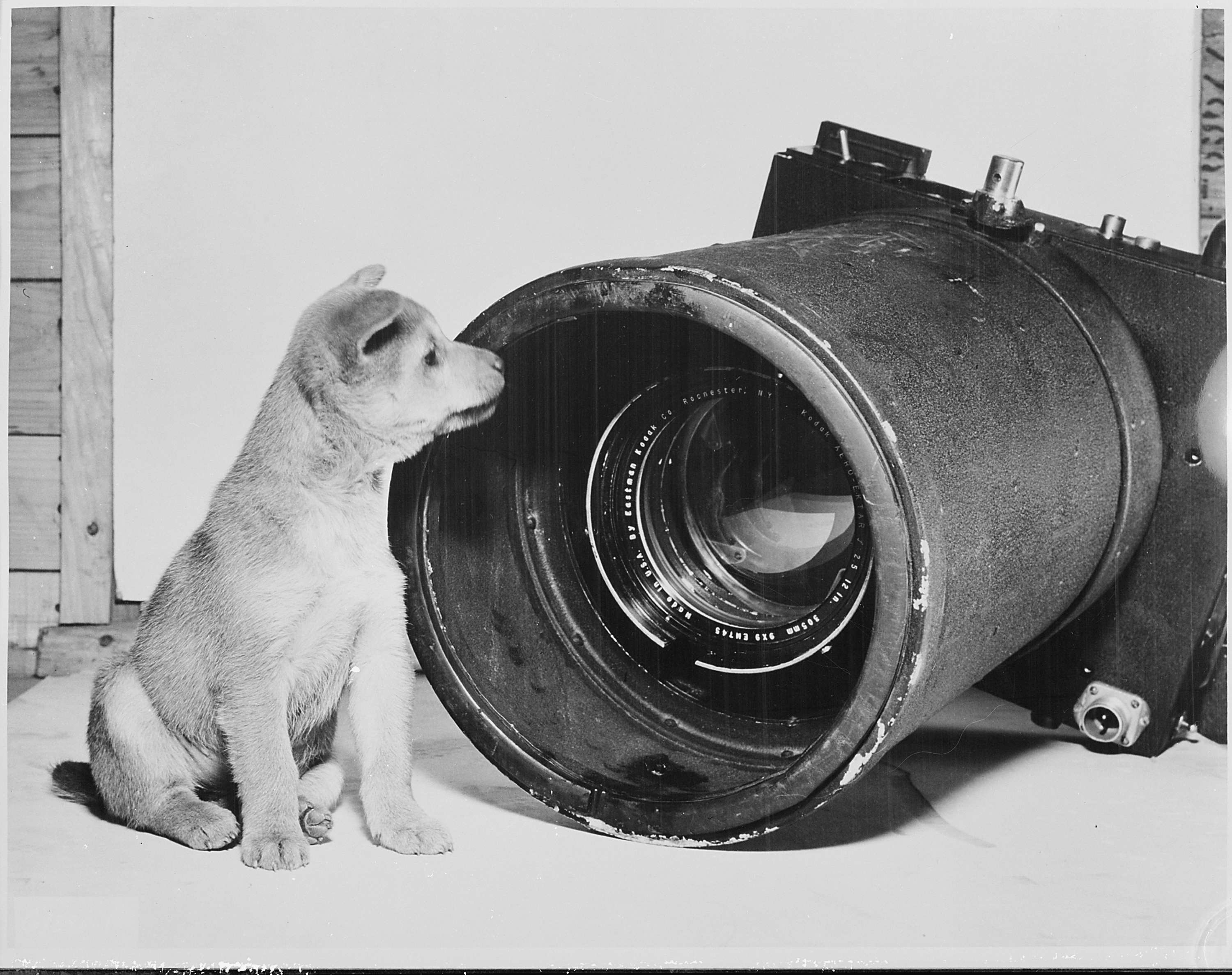
Kodak Aero-Ektar fitted to K-19B camera for aerial reconnaissance, with puppy (left)

As an alternative, after 1930, George W. Morey introduced borate glasses doped with lanthanum oxide and oxides of other rare-earth elements, greatly expanding the available range of high-index low-dispersion glasses; although lanthanum is also radioactive, it has far less activity than thorium. Borate glasses have lower wavelength-refraction dependence in the blue region of spectrum than silicate glasses with the same Abbe number. During WWII, Kodak manufactured high-performance thorium-free optical glass for aerial photography, but it was yellow-tinted. In combination with black and white film, the tint was actually beneficial, improving contrast by acting as an ultraviolet filter. The use of rare earths allowed development of high-index low-dispersion glasses of both crown and flint types.

The use of low-dispersion glass in long-focal-length lens assemblies was pioneered by Ernst Leitz GmbH (Leitz) after World War II. Leitz laboratories discovered that lanthanum(III) oxide could be used as a suitable replacement for thorium. However, additional elements had to be added to preserve the amorphous structure of the glass and prevent crystallization which would cause striae defects in images captured through those lenses.

These so-called "borate flint" glasses, which Schott classifies as KzF (kurzflint), are however highly susceptible to corrosion by acids, alkalis, and weather factors. However borate glass with more than 20 mol.% of lanthanum oxide is very durable under ambient conditions. Another high-performance glass contains a high proportion of zirconium dioxide; however its high melting point requires use of platinum lined crucibles to prevent contamination with crucible material.

Lenses which incorporate low-dispersion glass element(s) can be more expensive than equivalent lenses using classical glass elements. This is because several of the mentioned high-performance glasses require the production of high-purity chemicals in substantial quantities.

=== Calcium fluoride (fluorite) crystals ===
In parallel to the development of LD glass, artificially-grown fluorite (CaF_{2}) crystals were used starting in the 1960s for lens elements requiring low dispersion; however, there were significant drawbacks to using fluorite: the low refraction index of fluorite required high curvatures of the lenses, therefore increasing spherical aberration. In addition, fluorite has poor shape retention and is very fragile, requiring special handling to process into lens elements.

A good high-refraction replacement for calcium fluoride as a lens material can be a fluorophosphate glass. Here, a proportion of fluorides is stabilized with a metaphosphate, with addition of titanium dioxide.

== See also ==
- Aspheric lens
- Achromatic lens
- Abbe number
- Diffraction-limited system
- Material dispersion coefficient
