= George Bass (disambiguation) =

George Bass (1771–1803) was a British naval surgeon and explorer of Australia.

George Bass may also refer to:

- George Bass (archaeologist) (1932–2021), American underwater archaeologist
- George Bass (optician), British lens designer
- George Houston Bass (1938–1990), American playwright, director and writer
- George Henry Bass, founder of the American footwear brand G.H. Bass
