= Sony Carl Zeiss Sonnar T* FE 55mm F1.8 ZA =

Sony Zeiss Sonnar T* FE 55mm F1.8 ZA
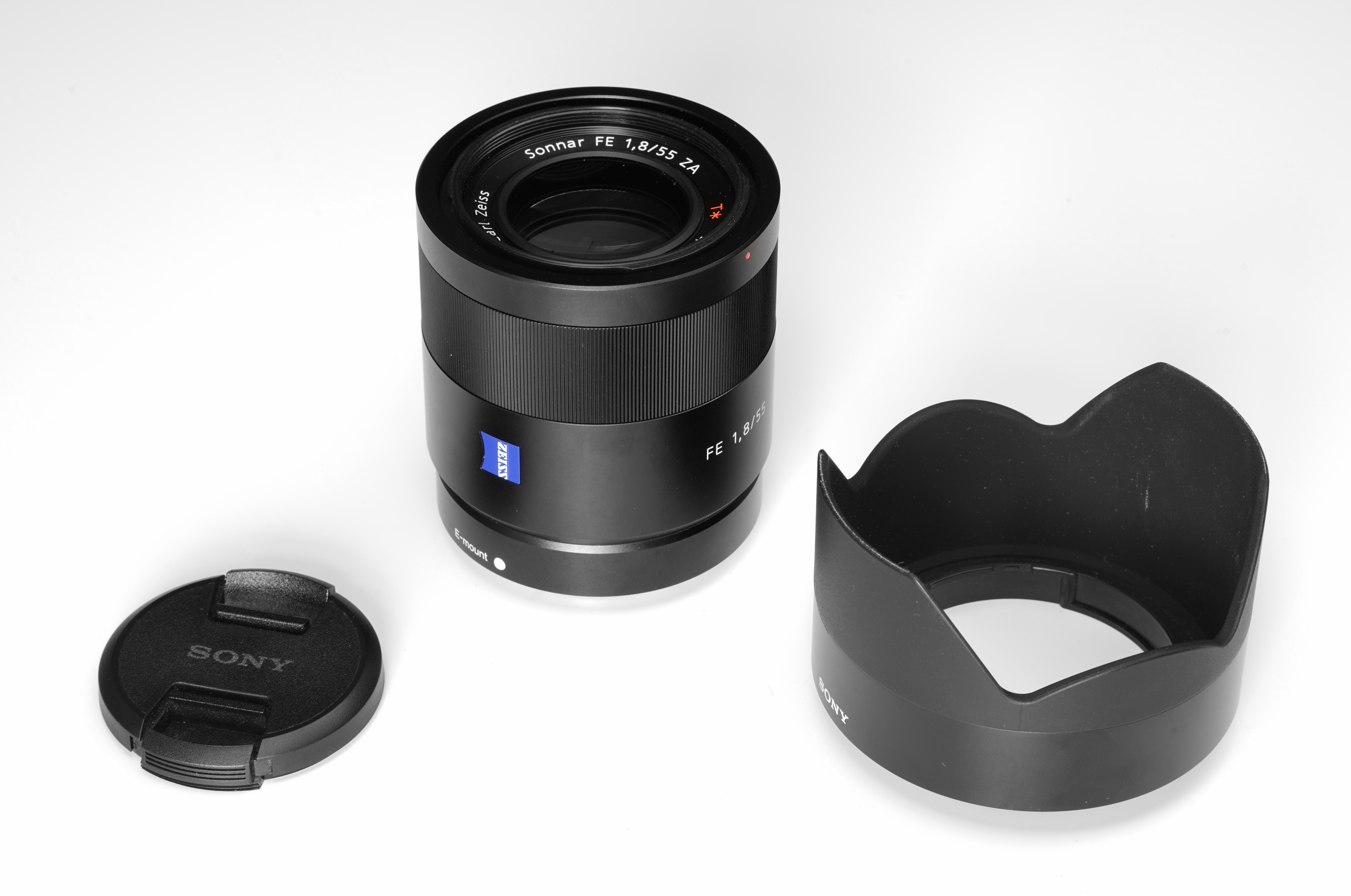
- Maker: Sony
- Lens mount(s): Sony E-mount

Technical data
- Type: Prime
- Focal length: 55mm
- Image format: 35mm full-frame
- Aperture (max/min): f/1.8-22
- Close focus distance: 0.50 metres (1.6 ft)
- Max. magnification: 1:7 (0.14x)
- Diaphragm blades: 9
- Construction: 7 elements in 5 groups

Features
- Manual focus override: Yes Yes
- Weather-sealing: Yes Yes
- Lens-based stabilization: No No
- Aperture ring: No No
- Unique features: Carl Zeiss approved
- Application: Portrait, Street, Low-light

Physical
- Max. length: 71 millimetres (2.8 in)
- Diameter: 64 millimetres (2.5 in)
- Weight: 281 grams (0.619 lb)
- Filter diameter: 49mm

Accessories
- Lens hood: Petal-type, ALC-SH131

History
- Introduction: 2013

Retail info
- MSRP: $999 USD

The Sony Zeiss Sonnar T* FE 55mm F1.8 ZA is a standard full-frame prime lens for the Sony E-mount. It was announced by Sony on October 16, 2013.

Though designed for Sony's full frame E-mount cameras, the lens can be used on Sony's APS-C E-mount camera bodies with an equivalent full-frame field-of-view of 82.5mm.

== Build quality ==
The lens itself is made of a thin weather resistant aluminum shell over plastic internals. The lens showcases a minimalist black exterior with a Zeiss badge on the side of the barrel, nearly identical to Sony's Zeiss-approved 24mm F1.8 APS-C lens. Autofocus is fast and quiet.

== Image quality ==
The lens is exceptionally sharp from its maximum aperture of f/1.8 across the frame. Distortion, vignetting, and chromatic aberration are all well controlled. In high contrast environments the lens showcases some strong spherochromatism or "color bokeh". The bokeh produced by this lens is smooth, with some mild "onion ring" lens artifacts present in demanding situations. Flare resistance is very good.

== See also ==
- List of Sony E-mount lenses
- Sony FE 50mm F1.8
- Zeiss Sonnar
