= Sony Carl Zeiss Sonnar T* E 24mm F1.8 ZA =

Camera lens

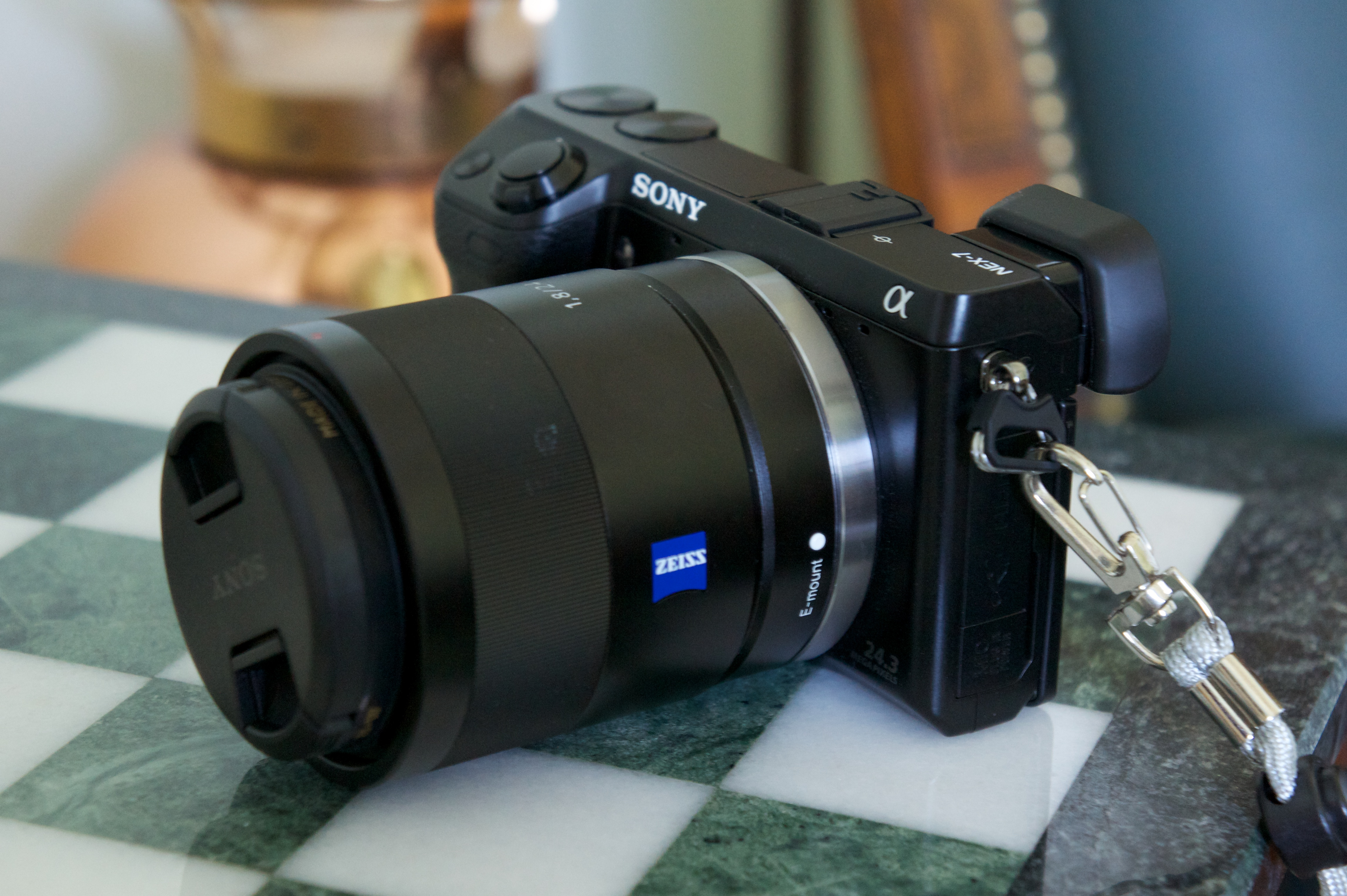
- Sony Zeiss 24mm lens mounted on the Sony NEX-7.
- Maker: Sony
- Lens mount(s): Sony E-mount

Technical data
- Type: Prime
- Focus drive: Stepper motor
- Focal length: 24mm
- Focal length (35mm equiv.): 36mm
- Image format: APS-C
- Aperture (max/min): f/1.8 - 22.0
- Close focus distance: 0.16 metres (0.52 ft)
- Max. magnification: 0.25x
- Diaphragm blades: 7
- Construction: 8 elements in 7 groups

Features
- Manual focus override: Yes Yes
- Weather-sealing: No No
- Lens-based stabilization: No No
- Aperture ring: No No
- Unique features: Carl Zeiss approved
- Application: Landscape, Street

Physical
- Max. length: 65.5 millimetres (2.58 in)
- Diameter: 63.0 millimetres (2.48 in)
- Weight: 225 grams (0.496 lb)
- Filter diameter: 49mm

Accessories
- Lens hood: included, bayonet

History
- Introduction: 2011

Retail info
- MSRP: $999 USD

The Sony Carl Zeiss Sonnar T* E 24mm F1.8 ZA is a wide-angle APS-C prime lens for the Sony E-mount, announced by Sony in December 2011.

== Build quality ==
The lens features a thin aluminum shell over plastic internals and a detachable petal-type lens hood. The lens showcases a minimalist black exterior with a Zeiss badge on the side of the barrel, nearly identical to Sony's Zeiss-approved 55mm F1.8 full-frame lens.

Given its unusually high 1:4 (0.25x) image reproduction ratio, the 24mm lens can be considered a pseudo-macro lens.

Its autofocus is fast and silent.

== Image quality ==
The lens is exceptionally sharp, on par with Sony's other Zeiss-approved prime lenses. When at its maximum aperture of f/1.8, the lens exhibits creamy smooth bokeh. The lens suffers from mild vignetting and chromatic aberration, which can be seen toward the outer edges of the frame.

== See also ==
- List of Sony E-mount lenses
- Sony E 20mm F2.8
- Sigma 30mm F1.4 DC DN
- Zeiss Sonnar
