= Sony E 50mm F1.8 OSS =

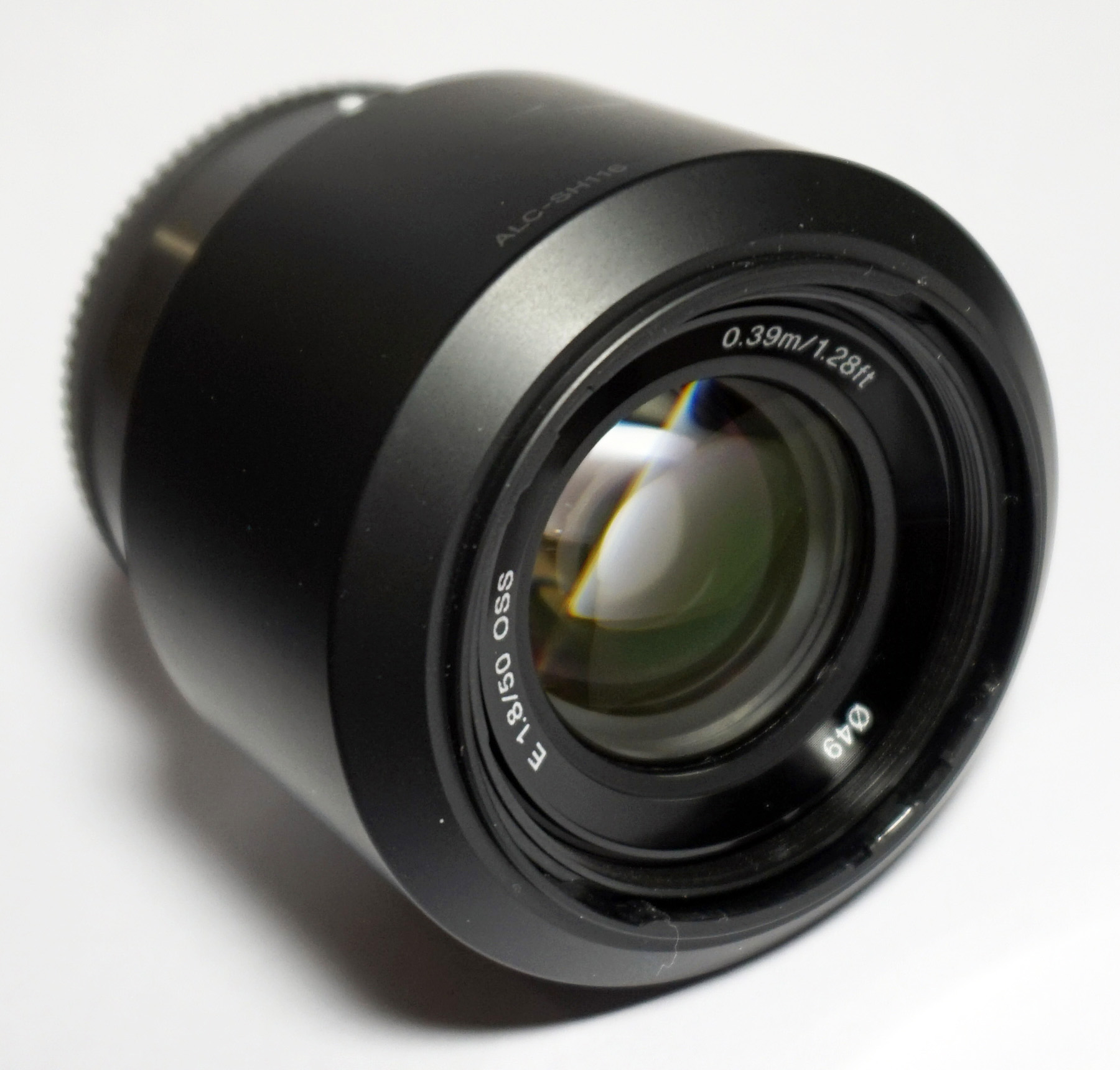
- Maker: Sony
- Lens mount(s): Sony E-mount

Technical data
- Type: Prime
- Focus drive: Autofocus
- Focal length: 50mm
- Focal length (35mm equiv.): 75mm
- Image format: APS-C
- Aperture (max/min): f/1.8-22.0
- Close focus distance: 0.39 metres (1.3 ft)
- Max. magnification: 1:6 (0.16x)
- Diaphragm blades: 7
- Construction: 9 elements in 8 groups

Features
- Manual focus override: Yes Yes
- Weather-sealing: No No
- Lens-based stabilization: Yes Yes
- Aperture ring: No No
- Application: Portrait, Low-Light

Physical
- Max. length: 62.0 millimetres (2.44 in)
- Diameter: 62.0 millimetres (2.44 in)
- Weight: 202 grams (0.445 lb)
- Filter diameter: 49mm

Accessories
- Lens hood: Plastic lens hood, ALC-SH116

History
- Introduction: 2011

Retail info
- MSRP: $298 USD

The Sony E 50mm F1.8 OSS is a short telephoto APS-C prime lens for the Sony E-mount, released by Sony on August 24, 2011.

== Build quality ==
The lens has a mixture of high quality plastic and aluminium body. It is a comparably compact lens with a metal mount and a silent, fast autofocus. Being a small telephoto lens with a focal length equivalent of 75mm one of its purposes is portrait shots.

It features OSS (Optical Steady Shot).

== Image quality ==
Wide open the lens is rather soft but stopping down to f/5.6 yields very sharp results. That way portraits shot wide open render soft with a very nice bokeh.

Distortion is very low and vignetting negligible, but the culprit of this lens is chromatic aberration which is very strong wide open and becomes acceptable only by stopping down towards f/5.6.

== See also ==
- List of Sony E-mount lenses
- Sony FE 50mm F1.8
