= Purple fringing =

Type of chromatic aberration in photography

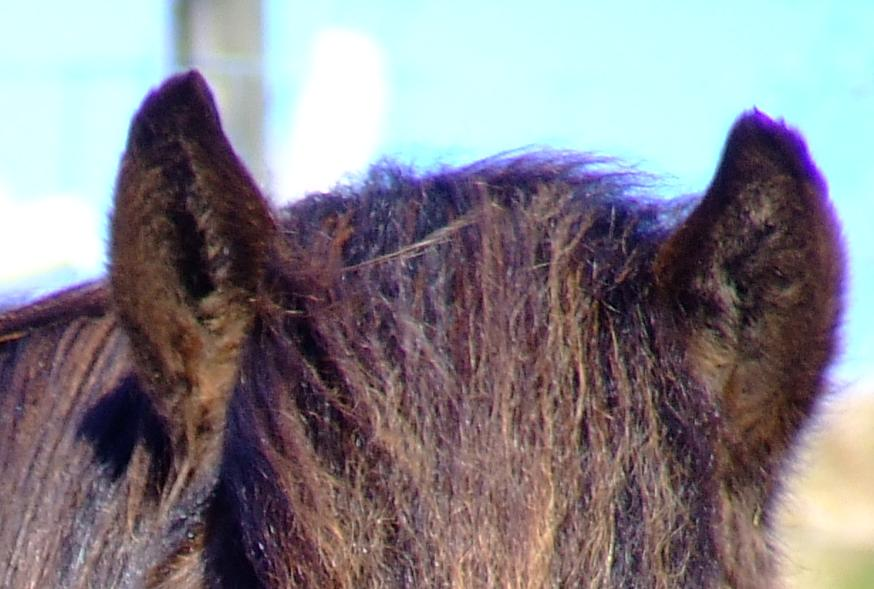
Severe purple fringing can be seen at the edges of the horse's forelock, mane, and ear.

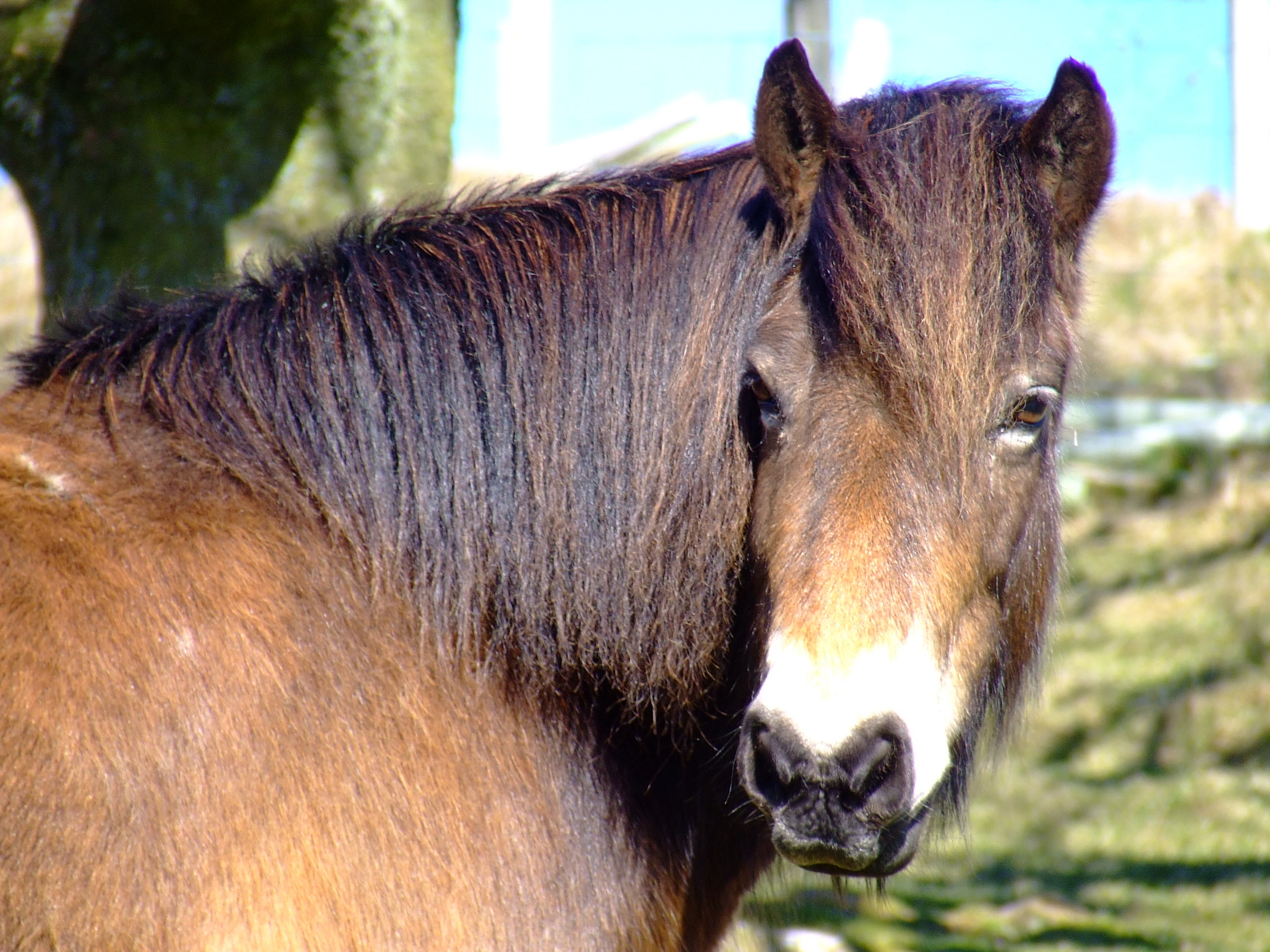
A wider-view context of the above cropped image, from a Fujifilm FinePix S5200 camera.

In photography (particularly digital photography), purple fringing (sometimes called PF) is the term for an unfocused purple or magenta "ghost" image on a photograph. This optical aberration is generally most visible as a coloring and lightening of dark edges adjacent to bright areas of broad-spectrum illumination, such as daylight or various types of gas-discharge lamps.

Lenses in general exhibit axial chromatic aberration, in which different colors of light do not focus in the same plane. Normally, lens designs are optimized so that two or more (at least three for apochromatic lenses) wavelengths of light in the visible spectrum focus at the same plane. Wavelengths very different from those optimized in the design process may be severely out of focus while the reference colors are in focus; this axial chromatic aberration is usually severe at short wavelengths (violet). Lens performance may be poor for such wavelengths in other ways too, including an increase in flare due to anti-reflective coatings' also being optimized for the expected wavelengths.

Most film has relatively low sensitivity to colors outside the visible range, so light spread in the near ultraviolet (UV) or near infrared (IR) rarely has a significant impact on the image recorded. However, image sensors used in digital cameras commonly are sensitive to a wider range of wavelengths. Although the lens glass itself filters out much of the UV light, and all digital cameras designed for color photography incorporate filters to reduce red and IR sensitivity, the chromatic aberration can be sufficient for unfocused violet light to tint nearby dark regions of the image. Bright cloudy or hazy skies are strong sources of scattered violet and UV light, so they tend to cause the problem.

The term purple fringe used to describe one aspect of chromatic aberration dates back to at least 1833, when David Brewster used it in his Treatise on Optics. However, Brewster's description with a purple fringe on one edge and a green fringe on the other is a lateral chromatic aberration. A general defocus of the shortest wavelengths resulting in a purple fringe on all sides of a bright object is the result of an axial or longitudinal chromatic aberration. Quite often, these effects are mixed in an image. Axial chromatic aberration is more subject to reduction by stopping down the lens than lateral chromatic aberration is, so the purple fringing can be very dependent on f-number: a larger f-number (smaller aperture) reduces axial aberration.

== Other explanations ==
Purple fringing is usually attributed to chromatic aberration as described above. Other attributed causes of purple fringing in digital photography include many hypothesized sensor effects:

- Digital noise in dark areas
- Image processing and interpolation artifacts (almost all CCDs and CMOS require considerable processing)
- Stray ultraviolet and/or infrared light
- Image bloom from overexposure of CCD sensor (not applied to CMOS)

== Mitigations ==
Commonly advocated methods of avoiding purple fringing include:

- Avoid shooting with a lens at fast apertures in high contrast scenes
- Avoid overexposing highlights (e.g. specular reflections and bright sky behind dark objects)
- Shoot with a strong UV-cut filter

Post-processing to remove purple fringing (or chromatic aberration in general) usually involves scaling the fringed colour channel, or subtracting some of a scaled version of the blue channel, or other blue-channel tricks.
