= George Bass (optician) =

George Bass was an optician known to have made an achromatic doublet around 1733.

The specifications for the lens elements were given by Chester Moore Hall. According to Hoyle, Hall wished to keep his work on the achromatic lenses a secret and contracted the manufacture of the crown and flint lenses to two different opticians, Edward Scarlett and James Mann. They in turn sub-contracted the work to the same person, George Bass. He realized the two components were for the same client and, after fitting the two parts together, noted the achromatic properties. Not being as reticent as Hall, Bass let others know of the lens's properties and the method of making an achromatic doublet spread.
