= Sony FE 50mm F1.8 =

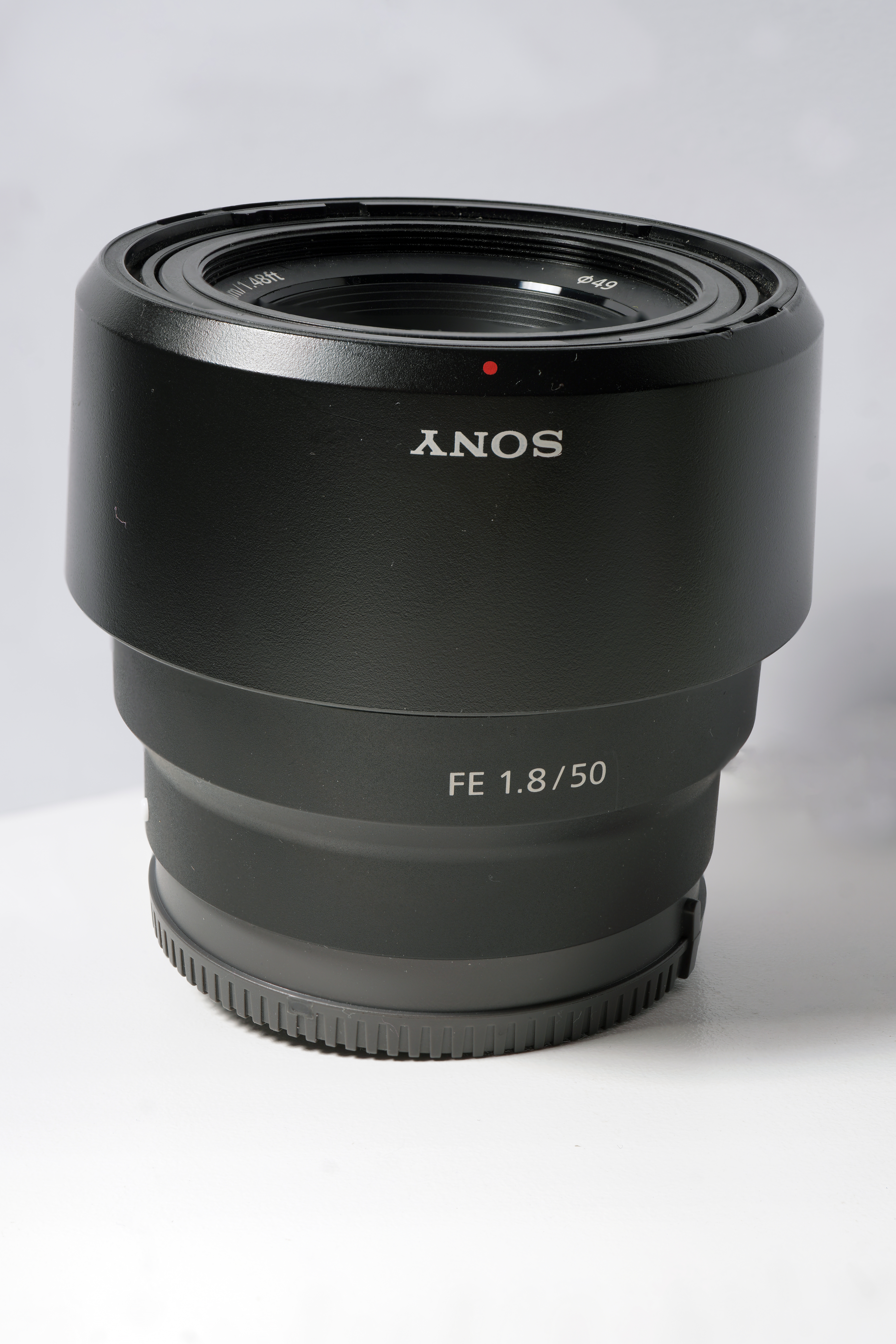
- Maker: Sony
- Lens mount: Sony E-mount

Technical data
- Type: Prime
- Focus drive: Direct Contact (DC) autofocus motor
- Focal length: 50mm
- Image format: 35mm full-frame
- Aperture (max/min): f/1.8-22.0
- Close focus distance: 0.45 metres (1.5 ft)
- Max. magnification: 1:7 (0.14x)
- Diaphragm blades: 7
- Construction: 6 elements in 5 groups

Features
- Manual focus override: Yes Yes
- Weather-sealing: No No
- Lens-based stabilization: No No
- Aperture ring: No No
- Application: Multipurpose

Physical
- Max. length: 59.5 millimetres (2.34 in)
- Diameter: 68.6 millimetres (2.70 in)
- Weight: 186 grams (0.410 lb)
- Filter diameter: 49mm

History
- Introduction: 2016

Retail info
- MSRP: $248 USD

The Sony FE 50mm F1.8 is a standard full-frame prime lens for the Sony E-mount, released by Sony in 2016.

The lens is one of Sony's first budget lens offerings for the 50mm focal length. Though designed for Sony's full frame E-mount cameras, the lens can be used on Sony's APS-C E-mount camera bodies, with an equivalent full-frame field-of-view of 75mm.

== Build quality ==
The lens features a plastic exterior over plastic internals and a rubber focus ring. It showcases recessed front lens element, focusing ring, and a matte black finish. The lens is also one of Sony's only Full-Frame lenses lacking weather resistance.

== See also ==
- List of Sony E-mount lenses
- Sony E 50mm F1.8 OSS
- Sony FE 55mm F1.8 ZA
