= Phosphate glass =

Phosphor oxide based glass in which SiO2 is replaced by P2O5 as network former

Phosphate glass is a class of optical glasses composed of metaphosphates of various metals. Instead of SiO_{2} in silicate glasses, the glass forming substrate is P_{2}O_{5}.

== Discovery ==
Dr. Alexis G. Pincus of the American Optical Company supplied aluminium phosphate glass samples for Manhattan Project-era Oak Ridge researchers, and was anecdotally called the inventor in 1945 in a Columbia University researcher's note by Aristid V. Grosse.

== Physical properties ==
P_{2}O_{5} crystallizes in at least four forms. The most familiar polymorph (see figure) comprises molecules of P_{4}O_{10}. The other polymorphs are polymeric, but in each case the phosphorus atoms are bound by a tetrahedron of oxygen atoms, one of which forms a terminal P=O bond. The O-form adopts a layered structure consisting of interconnected P_{6}O_{6} rings, not unlike the structure adopted by certain polysilicates.

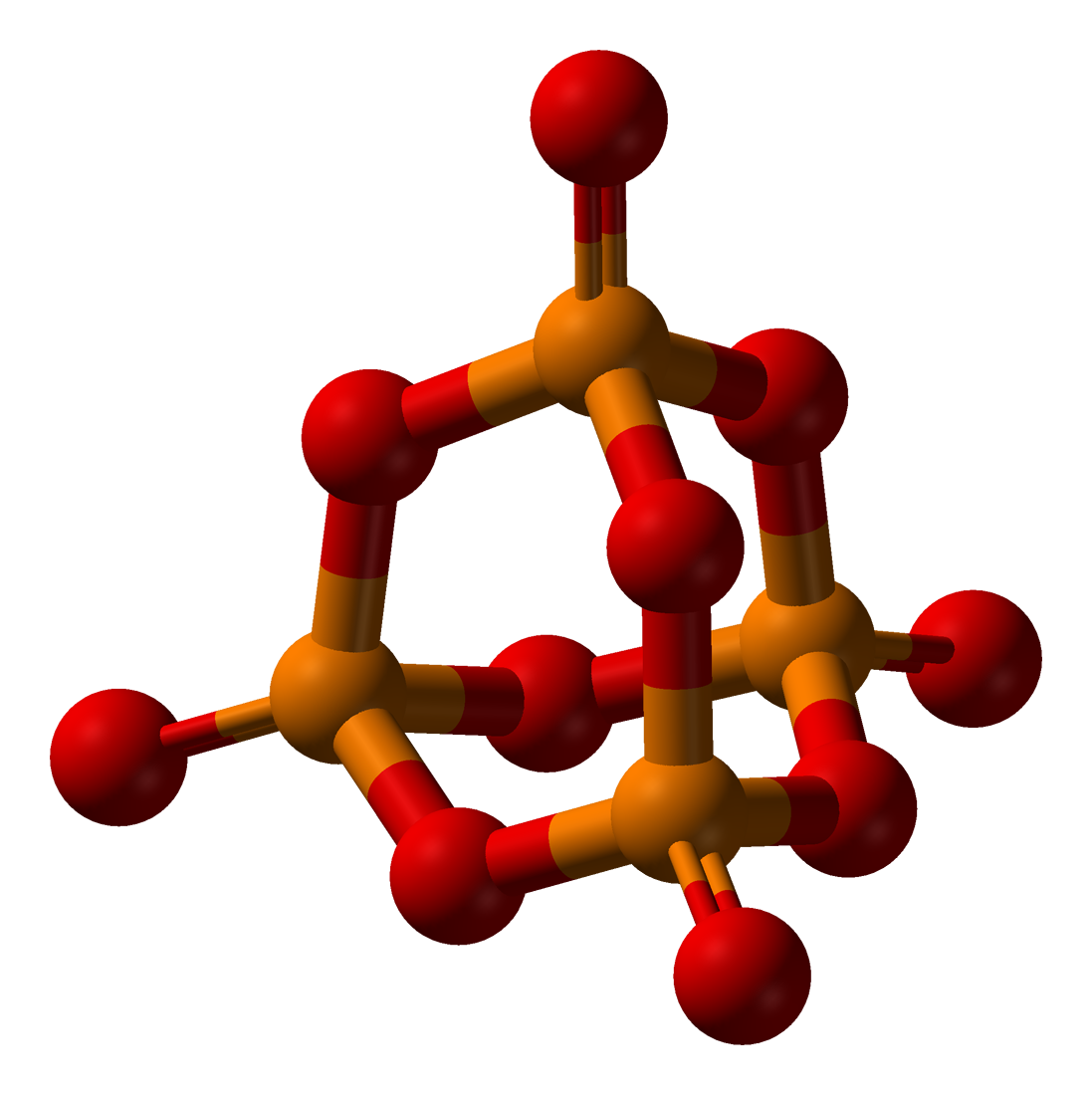
The P_{4}O_{10} cagelike structure, resembling that of adamantane, which provides the basic building block for phosphate glass formers.

Phosphate glasses are highly resistant to hydrofluoric acid. With an addition of iron oxide, they act as efficient heat absorbers.

Iron phosphate and lead iron phosphate glass are alternatives to borosilicate glass for immobilization of radioactive waste.

== Unique properties ==
Phosphate glasses can be advantageous over silica glasses for optical fibers with high concentration of doping rare earth ions.

A mix of fluoride glass and phosphate glass is fluorophosphate glass.

Silver-containing phosphate glass is used in phosphate glass dosimeters. It emits fluorescent light when irradiated by ultraviolet light, when previously exposed to ionizing radiation, in an amount proportional to the dose.

Some phosphate glasses are bio-compatible and water-soluble and are suited for use as degradable tissue and bone scaffolds within the human body.
