= Ursula Bellugi =

American psychologist (1931–2022)

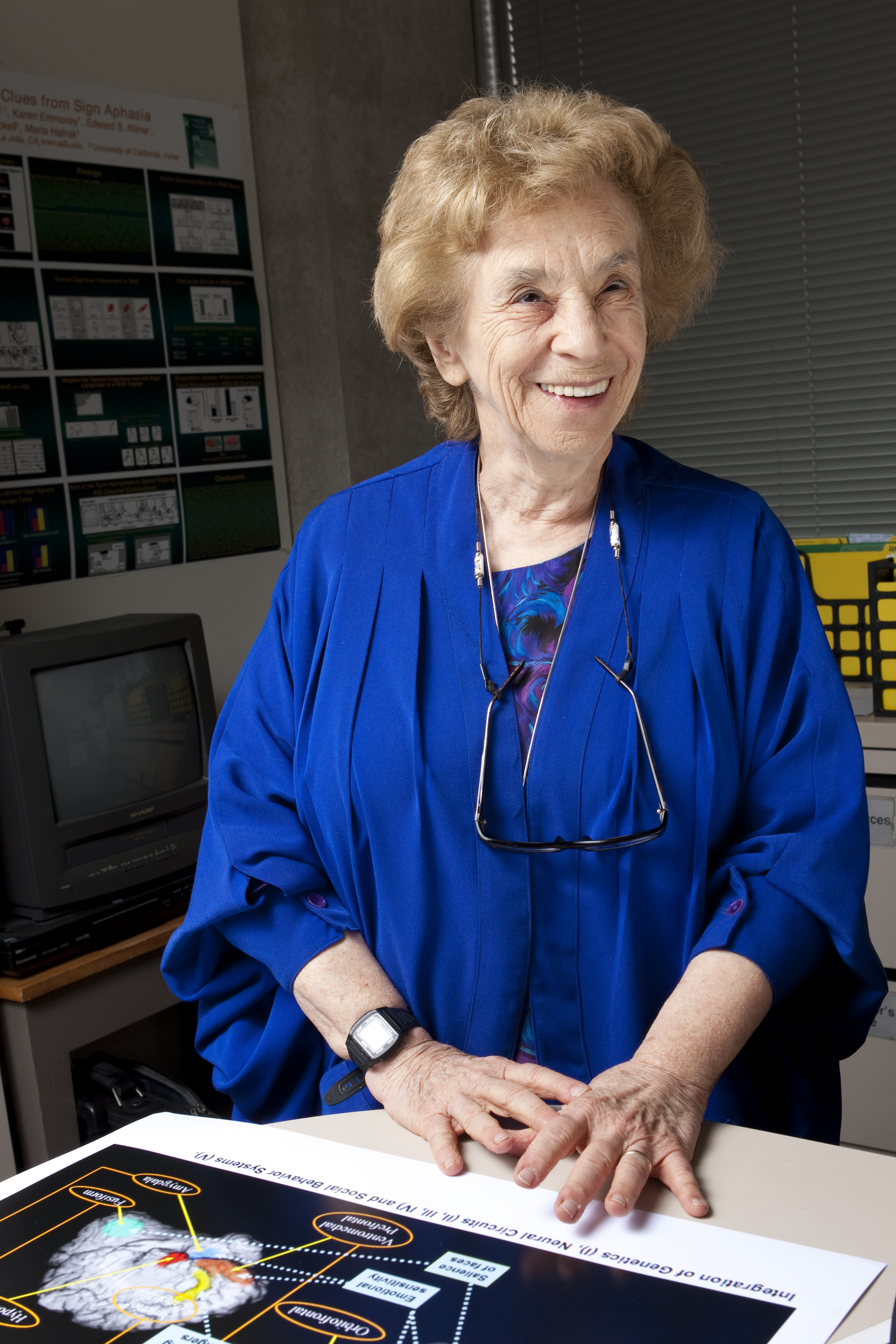
- Bellugi, 2010
- Born: February 21, 1931; Jena, Thuringia, Germany
- Died: April 17, 2022 (aged 91); La Jolla, California, U.S.
- Education: Harvard University; Antioch College
- Known for: Research on the neurological bases of American Sign Language and language representation in people with Williams Syndrome
- Spouses: Piero Bellugi; Edward Klima
- Children: 2
- Awards: National Academy of Sciences (2007); AAAS fellow(2007); Prize in Neuronal Plasticity from IPSEN Foundation; Two MERIT awards from NICHD; Distinguished Scientific Contribution Award, American Psychological Association; Jacob Javitz Neuroscience Investigator Award from NIDCD; Distinguished Scientific Contribution Award, American Psychological Association; Woman of the Decade Award; Member, Advisory Council to NIDCD
- Scientific career
- Fields: Cognitive neuroscience Psycholinguistics
- Workplaces: Salk Institute; University of California, San Diego; San Diego State University

Ursula Bellugi (February 21, 1931 – April 17, 2022) was an American cognitive neuroscientist. She was a Distinguished Professor Emerita and director of the Laboratory for Cognitive Neuroscience at the Salk Institute in La Jolla, California. She is known for research on the neurological bases of American Sign Language and language representation in people with Williams Syndrome.

== Early life and education ==
Bellugi was born in Jena, Germany. Her father was Maximilian Herzberger, a physicist and mathematician at the University of Jena. He was Jewish and lost his job during the Third Reich. Albert Einstein helped him to emigrate to Rochester, NY, where he became head of the Kodak company's optical research laboratories. She studied psychology and received a B.A. from Antioch College in 1952 and an Ed.D. from Harvard University in 1967.

== Career ==
In 1968 she moved to California, working at the Salk Institute. Beginning 1970 she was Director of its Laboratory for Cognitive Neuroscience. beginning 1977 she was an adjunct professor at the University of California, San Diego and after 1995 at San Diego State University. She was an associate with the Sloan Center for Theoretical Neurobiology at the Salk Institute.

== Research ==
Broadly stated, she conducted research on the biological bases of language. More specifically, she studied the neurological bases of American Sign Language extensively, and her work led to the discovery that the left hemisphere of the human brain becomes specialized for language, whether spoken or signed, a striking demonstration of neuronal plasticity.

She also investigated the language abilities of individuals with Williams Syndrome, a puzzling genetically based disorder that leaves language, facial recognition and social skills remarkably well-preserved in contrast to severe inadequacy in other cognitive aptitudes. The search for the underlying biological basis for this disorder is providing new opportunities for understanding how brain structure and function relate to cognitive capabilities. Her work with both communities caused her to receive love and admiration for her work and efforts. Bellugi was even given a special sign in ASL by those she worked with, and was affectionately referred to as "Dr.B" by those within the Williams Syndrome Association.

== Honors and distinctions ==
Bellugi was recognized with numerous awards, including the Distinguished Scientific Contribution Award from the American Psychological Association (1992). In 2007 she was elected a fellow of the American Association for the Advancement of Science, and in 2008 she was elected a member of the National Academy of Sciences. She was also on the advisory council of the National Institute on Deafness and Other Communication Disorders.

== Personal life ==
In 1954 Bellugi married the Italian conductor Piero Bellugi., whom she divorced while in Cambridge. She conducted much of her research in collaboration with her second husband Edward Klima, a linguist who also specialized in the study of American Sign Language at the University of California San Diego (UCSD). She had two sons, David and Rob.

She died on April 17, 2022, in La Jolla, California.

== Publications ==
=== Books ===
1. The Signs of Language. Klima, E.S., & Bellugi, U. Cambridge, MA: Harvard University Press, 1979. —Paperback Edition, 1988; —Reprinted, 1995. (Award from Association of American Publishers for Most Outstanding Book in the Behavioral Sciences).
2. Signed and Spoken Language: Biological Constraints on Linguistic Form. Bellugi, U., & Studdert-Kennedy, M. Dahlem Konferenzen. Weinheim/Deerfield Beach, FL: Verlag Chemie, 1980.
3. What the Hands Reveal about the Brain. Poizner, H., Klima, E.S., & Bellugi, U. Cambridge, MA: MIT Press/Bradford Books, 1987.
4. Language, modality and the brain. Trends in Neurosciences. 10, 380–388. (Reprinted in M.H. Johnson, (Ed.), Brain development and cognition. London: Blackwell).
5. Clues to the neurobiology of language. Bellugi, U., & Hickok, G. Washington, DC: Library of Congress.
6. The signs of aphasia. In F. Boller & J. Grafman (Eds.), Handbook of neuropsychology, (2nd ed pp 38–50). Hickok, G., & Bellugi, U. Amsterdam, The Netherlands: Elsevier Science Publishers.
7. Bridging cognition, brain and molecular genetics: Evidence from Williams syndrome. Trends in Neurosciences, 5, 197–208. Bellugi, U., Lichtenberger, L., Mills, D., Galaburda, A. & Korenberg, J.R. (1999).
8. Journey from cognition to brain to gene: New perspectives from Williams Syndrome. Bellugi, U. & St. George, M. (Eds.) Cambridge, MA: MIT Press, 2001.
9. Affect, social behavior and brain in Williams syndrome. Current Directions in Psychological Science. Bellugi, U., Järvinen-Pasley, A., Doyle, T., Reilly, J., & Korenberg, J. (2007).
10. Williams syndrome : A neurogenetic model of human behavior. In Encyclopedia of the Human Genome. Korenberg, J.R., Bellugi, U., Salandanan, L.S., Mills, D.L., & Reiss, A.L.

=== Selected publications ===
- Chailangkarn, Thanathom; Trujillo, Cleber A.; Freitas, Beatriz C.; Hrvoj-Mihic, Branka; Herai, Roberto H.; Yu, Diana X.; Brown, Timothy T.; Marchetto, Maria C.; Bardy, Cedric (2016). "A human neurodevelopmental model for Williams syndrome". Nature.
- Bhatara, A.; Quintin, E.M.; Levy, B.; Bellugi, U.; Fombonne, E.; Levitin, D.J. (2010). "Perception of emotion in musical performance in adolescents with Autism spectrum disorder". Autism Research. 3: 214–225. doi:10.1002/aur.147. PMC 2963682. PMID 20717952.
