= Fluorophosphate glass =

Optical glass composed of metaphosphates and fluorides

Fluorophosphate glass is a class of optical glasses composed of metaphosphates and fluorides of various metals. It is a variant of phosphate glasses. Fluorophosphate glasses are very unusual in nature. Fluorophosphate glasses have ultra-low theoretical loss of 0.001 dB/km, longer fluorescent lifetime of rare earths, lower coefficient of thermal expansion of ~13×10^{−6}/°C.

Some fluorophosphate glasses are used as low dispersion glasses. Some show anomalous partial dispersion. One such glass is composed of Ba(PO_{3})_{2}, Al(PO_{3})_{3}, AlF_{3}, and alkaline earth fluorides MgF_{2}, CaF_{2}, SrF_{2}, and BaF_{2}, with possible addition of titanium, sodium, potassium, and/or hydrogen. The components by wt.% are 0.5–3% Mg, 8–10% Ca, 12–20% Sr, 9–12% Ba, 7–9% Al, 5–9% P, 8–12% O, and 35–38% F.

Some doped fluorophosphate glasses are used in laser technology. They are attractive here for their small refractive index nonlinearity. Rare-earth elements are popular dopants. One of the applications is for optical amplifiers.

Exotic dopants like fullerenes and quantum dots can be employed.

Tungsten-doped tin-fluorophosphate glasses (SnO-SnF_{2}-P_{2}O_{5}) can be used for hermetic sealing of organic light-emitting diodes and other devices.

== See also ==
- Thoriated glass
