= Edward Scarlett =

Edward Scarlett (1688 – 1743 in London) was an English optician and instrument maker, who first invented an eyeglass frame with earhooks in 1727. This frame is held by the nose and ears, at times the glasses were called in contrast to the nasal cannula and temples because they had short straps that pressed on the temple.

Among other things, Scarlett made polemoscopes (optical instruments that could be seen over obstacles) and tried not only to limit them to military use, but also to expel them. The lenses themselves were not, as often claimed, invented in 1285 by Salvino degli Armati.

Around 1733, Scarlett was commissioned by Chester Moor Hall, the inventor of color-pure lenses, to produce a partial lens of the first Achromaten. However, he passed this order on to George Bass. He had also received the subcontract for the other lens part and recognized the color purity of the double lens. So Bass could later pass on the mystery of the Achromaten to John Dollond, who received the patent for their production in 1758.

== See also ==
Eduard Scarlett (German)
