= Maximilian Herzberger =

German-American mathematician and physicist

Maximilian Jacob Herzberger
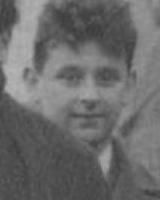
- At the visitors' conference of the Mathematical Society Jena, Oct 1930
- Born: March 17, 1899; Berlin, Germany
- Died: April 9, 1982 (aged 83); New Orleans, Louisiana, US
- Citizenship: United States
- Education: Berlin University
- Known for: Superachromat lens
- Spouse: Edith Kaufmann
- Children: Ruth (1928), Ursula Bellugi (1931), Hans (1932)
- Awards: Cressy Morrison Award (NYAS 1945), Frederic Ives Medal (OSA 1962)
- Scientific career
- Thesis: Ueber Systeme hyperkomplexer Grössen (1923)
- Doctoral advisors: Ludwig Bieberbach, Issai Schur

Maximilian Jacob Herzberger (7 or 17 Mar 1899, Berlin, Germany — 9 Apr 1982, New Orleans, United States) was a German-American mathematician and physicist, known for his development of the superachromat lens.

== Life ==
Maximilian Herzberger was the son of Leopold Herzberger (born 7 Mar 1870, Krefeld — died in Rochester (NY)) and Sonja/Sofia Behrendt/Berendt/Berends (22 Mar 1876, Petersburg (Germany) — 28 Jan 1945, Florence); he had a sister Olga (24 Sep 1897, Berlin — 2 Aug 1922, Berlin). The family was Jewish. He studied mathematics and physics at the Berlin University, where Albert Einstein was one of his professors, and later became a friend and advisor. In 1923, Herzberger finished his Ph.D. thesis Ueber Systeme hyperkomplexer Grössen under Ludwig Bieberbach and Issai Schur at the philosophical faculty. In 1925, he married Edith Kaufmann (10 Oct 1901, Stuttgart — 16 Feb 2001, Carlsbad (California) or New Orleans); they had three children, born in Jena, viz. Ruth (born 1928), Ursula Bellugi (1931), and Hans (6 Aug 1932, spouse of Radhika Herzberger). No later than Sep 1930, he was assistant of Hans Boegehold,^{(de)} the chief of calculation office at Carl Zeiss Jena.

In 1934, the Nazis deprived him from his professorship at Jena University and his contract with Zeiss. Leaving Germany with a "total of $10 in my pockets"., he went initially to the Netherlands, where he was hosted by the Dutch physicist A.C.S. van Heel. After the Nazi occupation of the Netherlands, he emigrated with his family to Rochester (NY), where he became head of Eastman Kodak's optical research laboratories, arranged by Einstein. In 1940, he and his family became U.S. citizens. In 1945, he got the Cressy Morrison Award of the New York Academy of Sciences.

In 1954 he finished the development of the superachromat as the ultimately well-corrected lens for Kodak. in 1959, he was part of the inaugural class of Fellows of the Optical Society of America. In 1962, he was awarded the Frederic Ives Medal of the Optical Society of America. In 1965, he retired from his position at Kodak, and helped building a graduate institute for optics in Switzerland, until in 1968 he followed invitation of the University of New Orleans to teach at their Physics Department.

He held patents for an "apochromatic telescope objective having three air spaced components", and a "superachromatic objective". He died on 9 April 1982.

== Publications ==
- Ueber Systeme hyperkomplexer Grössen, Max Herzberger, Berlin, 1923, Ebering.
- Untersuchungen über die Eigenschaften erster Ordnung von reellen Strahlensystemen, Jan 1928, De Gruyter, ISBN 9783111279886
- Untersuchungen über die Eigenschaften erster Ordnung von reellen Strahlensystemen, in: Journal für die reine und angewandte Mathematik, Vol.159, p. 36-49, 1928
- Über die geometrische Bedeutung des Rotationswinkels in der Strahlengeometrie, Jan 1928, De Gruyter, ISBN 9783111095615
- Über die geometrische Bedeutung des Rotationswinkels in der Strahlengeometrie, in: Journal für die reine und angewandte Mathematik, Vol.160, p. 33-37, 1929
- Gullstrand, Allvar, Complete Dictionary of Scientific Biography, 2008
- M. Herzberger, Allvar Gullstrand, in Optica Acta, Vol.3 (1960), p. 237–241
