= Glass code =

A glass code is a method of classifying glasses for optical use, such as the manufacture of lenses and prisms. There are many different types of glass with different compositions and optical properties, and a glass code is used to distinguish between them.

There are several different glass classification schemes in use, most based on the catalogue systems used by glass manufacturers such as Pilkington and Schott Glass. These tend to be based on the material composition, for example BK7 is the Schott Glass classification of a common borosilicate crown glass.

== Technical definition ==
The international glass code is based on U.S. military standard MIL-G-174, and is a six-digit number specifying the glass according to its refractive index n_{d} at the Fraunhofer d- (or D_{3}-) line, 587.5618 nm, and its Abbe number V_{d} also taken at that line. The resulting glass code is the value of n_{d} − 1 rounded to three digits, followed by V_{d} rounded to three digits, with all decimal points ignored. For example, BK7 has n_{d} = 1.5168 and V_{d} = 64.17, giving a six-digit glass code of 517642.

Consequently, a linear approximation for the refractive index dispersion close to that wavelength is given by:

$$n(\lambda) = \frac{ 1 - n_\mathsf{d} }{ 170.2 V_\mathsf{d} }(\lambda - 589.3) + n_\mathsf{d}\ ,$$

where $\lambda$ is the wavelength in nanometers.

The following table shows some example glasses and their glass code. Note that the glass properties can vary slightly between different manufacturer types.

Glass	n_{d}	V_{d}	Glass code	Manufacturer name			
Glass	n_{d}	V_{d}	Glass code	Schott	Pilkington	Hoya	Ohara
Borosilicate crown	1.5168	64.17	517642	BK7	BSC517642	BSC7	S-BSL7
Barium crown	1.5688	56.05	569561	BaK4	MBC569561	BaC4	S-BAL14
Dense crown	1.6204	60.32	620603	SK16	DBC620603	BaCD16	S-BSM16
Lanthanum flint	1.7439	44.85	744448	LaF2	LAF744447	LaF2	S-LAM2
Dense flint	1.7847	25.76	785258	SF11	DEDF785258	FD11	S-TIH11
