= Edward Klima =

American linguist

- Born: Edward S. Klima; June 21, 1931; Cleveland, Ohio, U.S.
- Died: September 25, 2008 (aged 77); La Jolla, California, U.S.
- Education: Harvard University; Dartmouth College
- Known for: Research on the neurological bases of American Sign Language
- Awards: APA Distinguished Scientific Contribution Award, 1992
- Scientific career
- Fields: Linguistics; Psycholinguistics
- Workplaces: University of California, San Diego; Salk Institute

Edward S. Klima (June 21, 1931 – September 25, 2008) was an American linguist who specialized in the study of sign languages. Klima's work was heavily influenced by Noam Chomsky's then-revolutionary theory of the biological basis of linguistics, and applied that analysis to sign languages.

Klima, much of whose work was in collaboration with his wife, Ursula Bellugi, was among the first to prove that sign languages are complete languages and have complex grammars that have all the features of grammars of oral languages. Widespread recognition of this fact was one of the catalysts of the cultural changes in and towards the Deaf community in favor of encouraging the use of sign language, which had often been discouraged in favor of lip reading in the past.

== Education and career ==
Klima graduated from James Ford Rhodes High School in Cleveland, Ohio in 1949. He studied linguistics at Dartmouth College, earning his bachelor's degree in 1953. Two years later, he received a master's degree in the same subject from Harvard University. Starting in 1957, Klima worked as an Instructor at the Massachusetts Institute of Technology under Noam Chomsky. After earning his Ph.D. in linguistics from Harvard University in 1965, he joined the linguistics department at the University of California, San Diego. Later he also became an adjunct professor at the Salk Institute for Biological Studies, where his wife, Ursula Bellugi, was a professor, and director of the Laboratory for Cognitive Neuroscience (of which Klima acted as associate director).

While at MIT, he supervised Jeffrey S. Gruber.
