= Superachromat =

Photographic lens

Focus error for four types of lens, over the visible and near infrared spectrum.

The superachromat, or superachromatic lens, was first conceived and developed by Maximilian Herzberger as the ultimate well-corrected lens. The color shift curve of a superachromat is quartic, meaning that, in theory, four separate colors can be brought to focus in the same plane, while simultaneously correcting spherical aberration and field aberrations. This near-perfect correction of chromatic aberration is highly beneficial in both film and digital multi-spectral photography, as a superachromat can focus near-infrared energy in the 0.7 to 1.0 micrometer wavelength band in the same focal plane as visible light, eliminating the need for refocusing. Due to the limited selection of optical glasses and partial dispersion properties, superachromats must be manufactured with costly fluorite glass and to very tight tolerances.

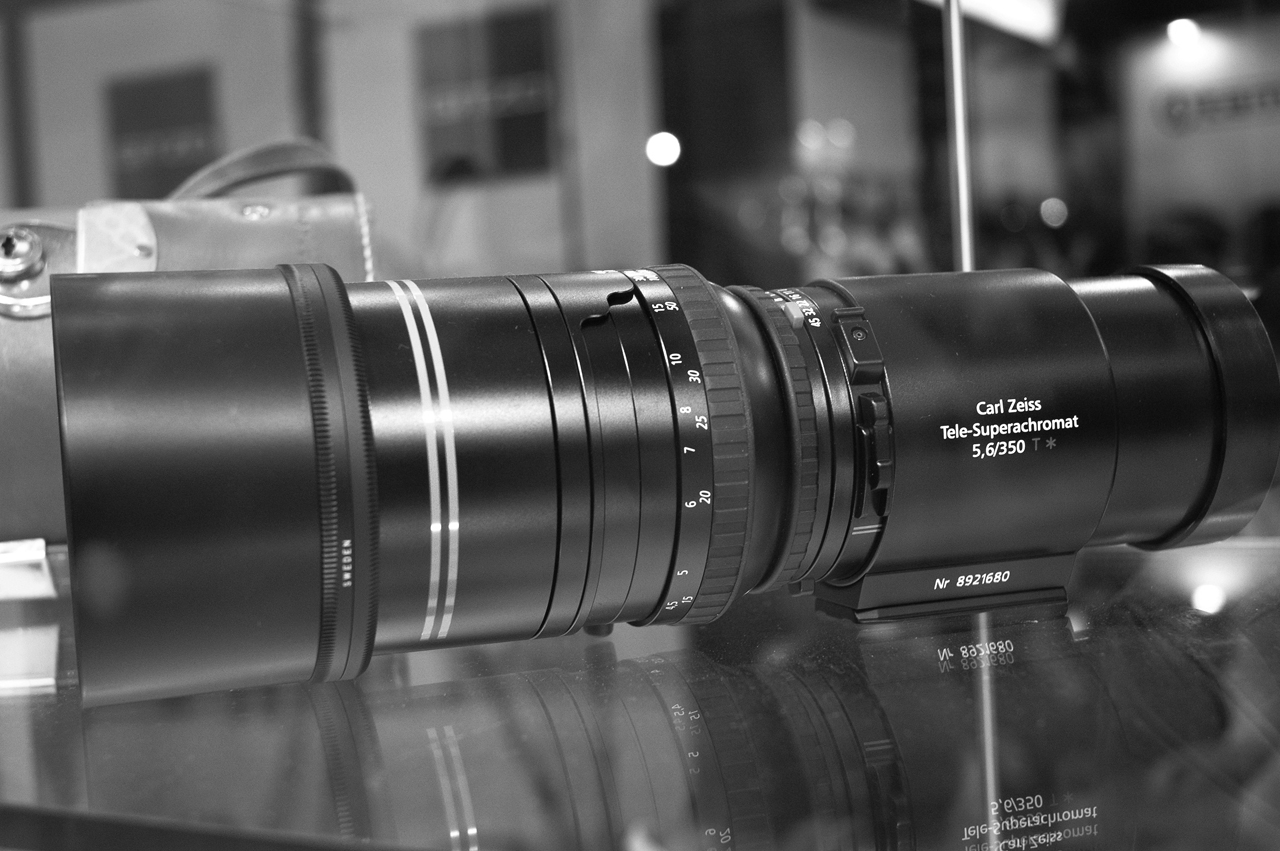
Carl Zeiss Tele-Superachromat, 5.6/350 T* lens.

== See also ==
- Photographic lens
- Achromat
- Apochromat
