= Sigma 300–800mm f/5.6 EX DG HSM lens =

300–800 mm f/5.6 EX DG APO HSM
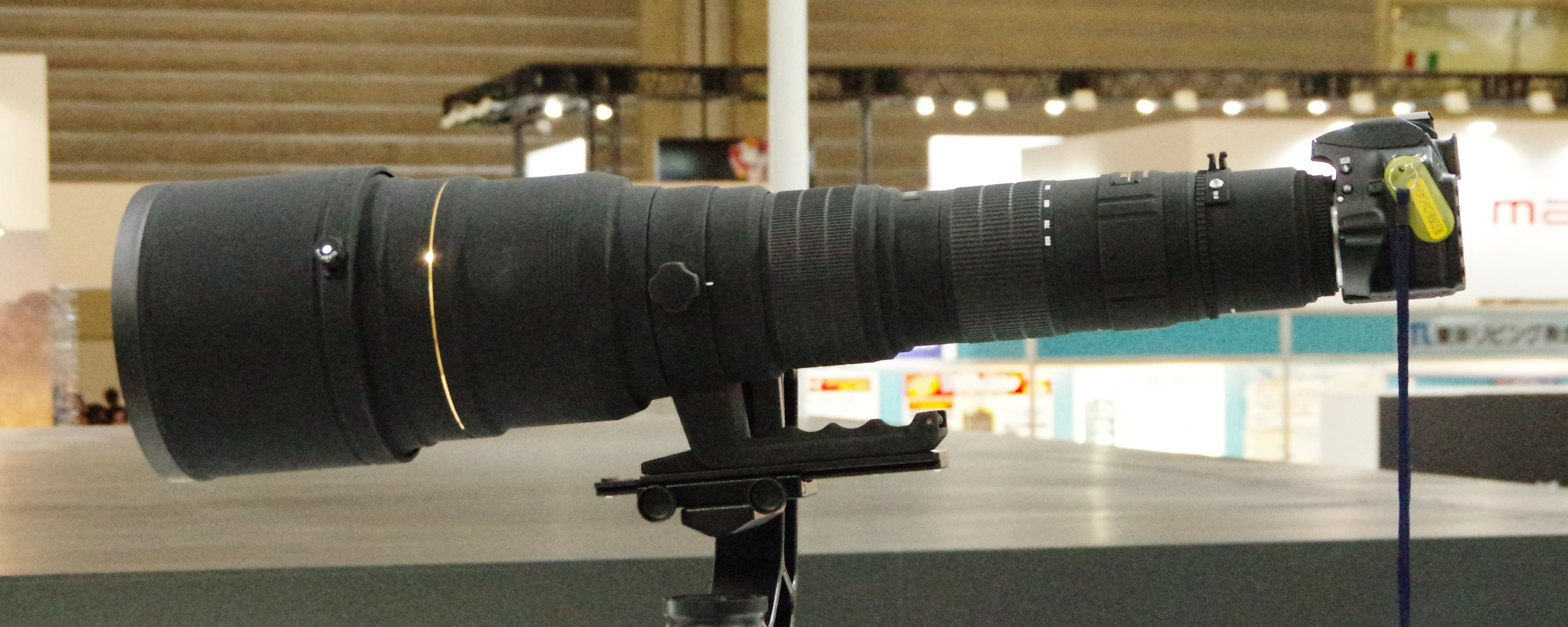
- Maker: Sigma

Technical data
- Type: Zoom
- Focus drive: Ultrasonic motor
- Focal length: 300 – 800 mm
- Aperture (max/min): f/5.6 – f/32
- Close focus distance: 600 cm (236.2 in)
- Max. magnification: 1:6.9
- Diaphragm blades: 9
- Construction: 18 elements in 16 groups

Features
- Lens-based stabilization: No No
- Macro capable: No No
- Application: professional super telephoto zoom for digital SLRs

Physical
- Max. length: 541.5 mm (21.3 in)
- Diameter: 156.5 mm (6.2 in)
- Weight: 5,870 g (207 oz)
- Filter diameter: 46 mm (rear drop-in)

Accessories
- Lens hood: LH1571-02

Angle of view
- Diagonal: 8.2° – 3.1°

Retail info
- MSRP: 8,000 USD (as of since April 2013, in USA)

The Sigma 300 – 800 mm lens is a professional-level supertelephoto zoom lens made by Sigma Corporation from 2002 to 2019 for use with analog and digital SLRs. Due to its massive size and weight, the lens has been nicknamed the "Sigmonster"

== History ==
The first model, named 300-800mm F5.6 EX IF APO HSM (manufacturer code 594) was announced on 4 October 2002 at that year's Photokina and first delivered on 29 January 2003. The construction of the lens has 18 optical elements in 16 groups including 2 ELD (extra-low dispersion) elements. Versions for Sigma SA, Canon EF and Nikon AF-S mounts were available. This lens was in production between 2003 and 2005. In a review, Popular Photography noted "the focus [was] surprisingly fast for such a big lens" and praised the full-time manual focusing ring, enabled by Sigma's ultrasonic ring focusing motor, but criticized the lack of a focus limiting switch.

On 14 February 2005, the DG variants of several Sigma lenses have been announced, including an updated version of the 300-800mm lens, now named 300-800mm F5.6 EX DG APO HSM (manufacturer code 595). The new lens has a better coating designed to reduce flare from digital SLRs sensors. Since 29 April 2005, the lens was available for customers, replacing the previous model. For the DG lens, the Nikon version lost an aperture ring so the lens can be equated to Nikon G lenses in this aspect. In addition to the Sigma, Canon and Nikon versions, the Four Thirds version was announced on 26 September 2006 and produced for several years. The Four Thirds version is slightly longer (549.4mm) and heavier (5915g) than the other mount versions; data for Sigma SA mount is shown.

Sigma discontinued production of the Sigmonster in all mounts before 2022, as part of a larger discontinuation of lenses with dSLR mounts.

Release Feature	300-800mm F5.6 EX IF APO HSM (2002)	300-800mm F5.6 EX DG APO HSM (2005)
Focal length	300~800 mm	
Aperture	f/5.6–32	
AF motor	HSM (ultrasonic ring)	
Construction	18e/16g 2 ELD	
Min. focus dist.	600 cm (236.2 in)	
Max. mag.	1:6.9	
Filter (mm)	46 (rear)	
Dims. (Φ×L)	156.5 mm × 541.5 mm (6.16 in × 21.32 in)	156.5 mm × 544 mm–549.4 mm (6.16 in × 21.42 in–21.63 in)
Wgt.	5,870 g (207 oz)	5,880–5,915 g (207.4–208.6 oz)
Mounts	Sigma SA, Nikon (AF-D), Canon EF	Sigma SA, Nikon (AF-D), Canon EF, 4/3

== See also ==
- List of Nikon F-mount lenses with integrated autofocus motors
