= Wollaston landscape lens =

Meniscus lens

Wollaston Meniscus

The Wollaston landscape lens, named for William Hyde Wollaston, was a meniscus lens with a small aperture stop in front of the concave side of the lens, providing some improvement of aberrations. It was devised in 1812. It was the first reasonably sharp over a wide field (about 45° at f/11 or f/16) lens. Wollaston fitted it to an artist's aid camera obscura in 1812.

This lens was still used in low-priced cameras in the mid-20th century. Besides its cheapness, the lens has the advantage of having only two glass-air surfaces.
