= Sigma 200-500mm f/2.8 EX DG lens =

200–500mm f/2.8 EX DG
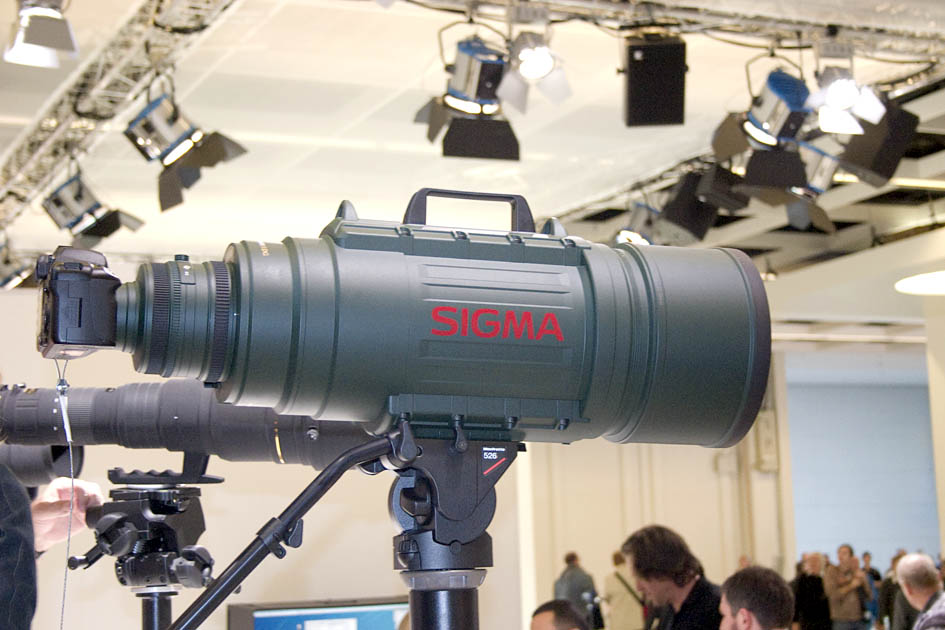
- Maker: Sigma

Technical data
- Type: Zoom
- Focal length: 200-500mm (400-1000mm with included teleconverter)
- Crop factor: 1.0
- Aperture (max/min): f/2.8-f/22
- Close focus distance: 200-500cm
- Max. magnification: 1:7.7
- Diaphragm blades: 9
- Construction: 17 elements in 13 groups

Features
- Short back focus: No No
- Lens-based stabilization: No No
- Macro capable: No No
- Application: Wildlife, Sports

Physical
- Max. length: 726 mm (28.6 in)
- Diameter: 236.5 mm (9.31 in)
- Weight: 15.7 kg (35 lb)
- Filter diameter: 72mm (rear drop-in)

Accessories
- Lens hood: Custom

Angle of view
- Diagonal: 12.3 to 5 degrees

History
- Introduction: January 2008

Retail info
- MSRP: 25,999 USD

The Sigma 200-500mm f/2.8 EX DG lens is a professional-level telephoto zoom lens made by Sigma Corporation. It is notable for being the first lens with an aperture of f/2.8 and a focal length of 500mm. This combination allows very distant objects to be photographed at high shutter speeds in dimmer light, compared to other telephoto lenses. It also allows for very narrow depth-of-field and diffuse bokeh. The main markets for such long, fast lenses are wildlife and sports photographers.

The lens is available in Canon, Nikon, and Sigma mounts. Due to the size and weight of the lens, there are some unusual usage considerations. Both focus and zoom are by-wire, driven using an internal battery-powered motor. The lens has an LCD panel indicating the current zoom and focus distance. Tripod usage is mandatory, although unlike the similarly-sized Canon EF 1200mm lens, the Sigma 200-500 f/2.8 does not include a tripod. The lens also ships with a dedicated 2x teleconverter, which transforms it into a 400-1000mm f/5.6, maintaining autofocus operation.
