= Crown glass (optics) =

Type of glass

Crown glass is a type of optical glass used in lenses and other optical components. It has a relatively low refractive index (≈1.52) and low dispersion (with Abbe numbers between 50 and 85). Crown glass is produced from alkali-lime silicates containing about 10% potassium oxide and is one of the earliest low-dispersion glasses.

== History ==
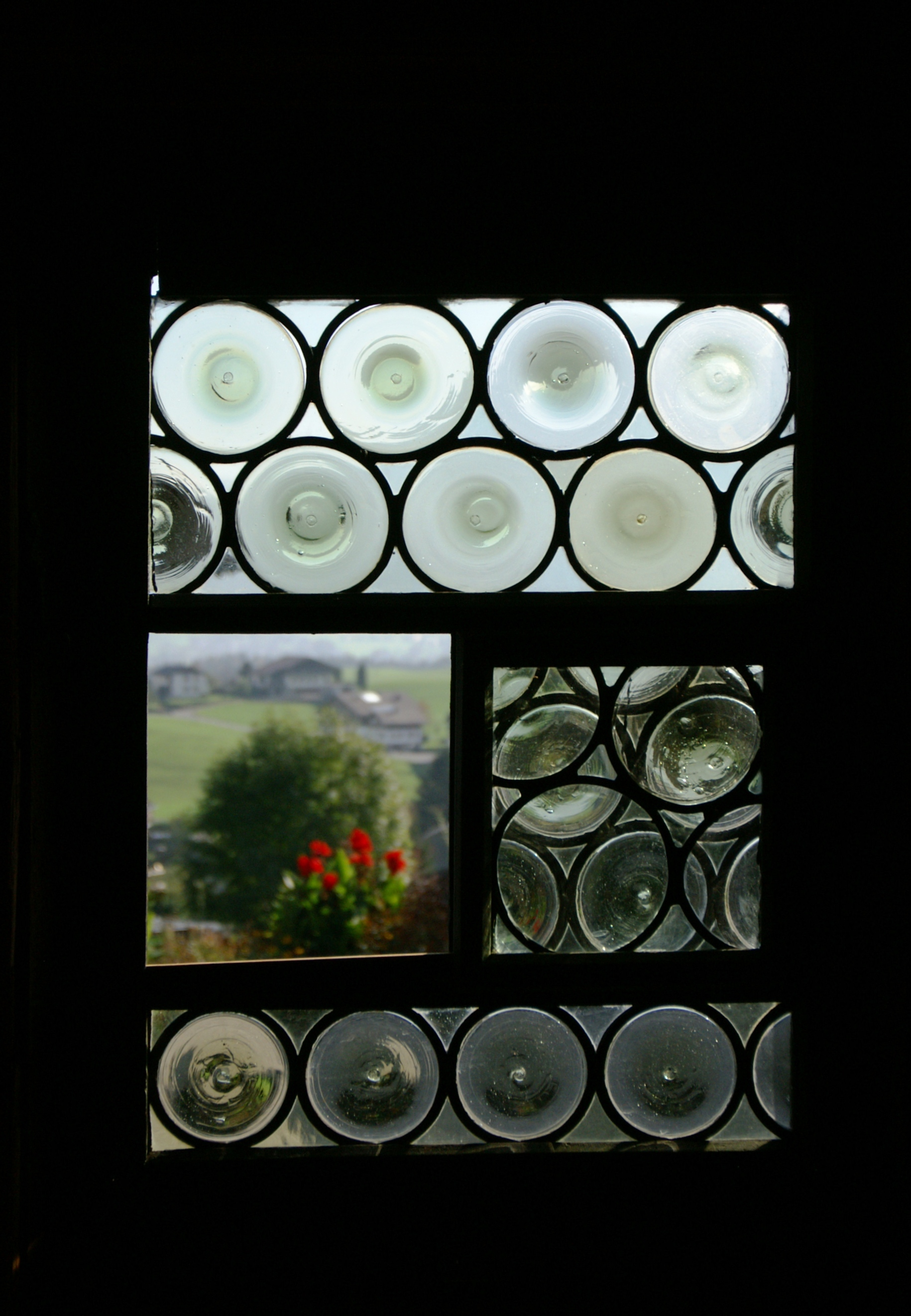
A crown glass window

The term originated from crown-glass windows, a method of window production that began in France during the Middle Ages. A molten blob of glass was attached to a pole and spun rapidly, flattening it out into a large disk from which windows were cut. The center, called the "crown" or "bullseye", was too thick for windows, but was often used to make lenses or deck prisms.

== Types ==
The borosilicate glass Schott BK7 (glass code 517642) is an extremely common crown glass, used in precision lenses. Borosilicates contain about 10% boric oxide, have good optical and mechanical characteristics, and are resistant to chemical and environmental damage. Other additives used in crown glasses include zinc oxide, phosphorus pentoxide, barium oxide, fluorite, and lanthanum oxide. The contrast of crown with flint glass is so important to optical glass technology that many glass names, notably Schott glasses, incorporate it. A K in a Schott name indicates a crown glass (Krone in German). The B in BK7 indicates that it is a borosilicate glass composition.

BAK-4 barium crown glass (glass code 569560) has a higher index of refraction than BK7, and is used for prisms in high-end binoculars. In that application, it gives better image quality and a round exit pupil.

An achromatic doublet, which combines crown glass and flint glass.

A concave lens of flint glass is commonly combined with a convex lens of crown glass to produce an achromatic doublet. The dispersions of the glasses partially compensate for each other, producing reduced chromatic aberration compared to a singlet lens with the same focal length.

== See also ==
- History of the achromatic telescope
- John Dollond, who patented and commercialised the crown/flint doublet
