= Apochromat =

Type of photographic or other lens

Chromatic aberration of a single lens causes different wavelengths of light to have differing focal lengths.

An apochromat, or apochromatic lens (apo), is a photographic or other lens that has better correction of chromatic and spherical aberration than the much more common achromat lenses.

The prefix apo- comes from the Greek preposition ἀπό-, meaning free from or away from.

== Explanation ==
Chromatic aberration is the phenomenon of different colors focusing at different distances from a lens. In photography, chromatic aberration produces soft overall images, and color fringing at high-contrast edges, like an edge between black and white. Astronomers face similar problems, particularly with telescopes that use lenses rather than mirrors. Achromatic lenses are corrected to bring two wavelengths into focus in the same plane – typically red (~0.590 μm) and blue (~0.495 μm). Apochromatic lenses are designed to bring three colors into focus in the same plane – typically red (~0.620 μm), green (~0.530 μm), and blue (~0.465 μm). The residual color error (secondary spectrum) can be up to an order of magnitude less than for an achromatic lens of equivalent aperture and focal length. Apochromats are also corrected for spherical aberration at two wavelengths, rather than one as in an achromat.

Apochromatic lens brings three colors to a common focal plane. Notice that this lens is designed for astronomy, not viewing, since one of the wavelengths (~0.780 μm) is in the near infrared, outside the visible spectrum.

Telescope objective lenses for wide-band digital imaging in astronomy must have apochromatic correction, as the optical sensitivity of typical CCD imaging arrays can extend from the ultraviolet through the visible spectrum and into the near infrared wavelength range. Apochromatic lenses for astrophotography in the 60–150 mm aperture range have been developed and marketed by several firms, with focal ratios ranging from f/5 to f/7. Focused and guided properly during the exposure, these apochromatic objectives are capable of producing the sharpest wide-field astrophotographs optically possible for the given aperture sizes.

Graphic arts process (copy) cameras generally use apochromatic lenses for sharpest possible imagery as well. Classically designed apochromatic process camera lenses generally have a maximum aperture limited to about f/9. More recently, higher-speed apochromatic lenses have been produced for medium format, digital and 35 mm cameras.

The Apochromatic lens usually comprises three elements that bring light of three distinct colors to a common focus

Apochromatic designs require optical glasses with special dispersive properties to achieve three color crossings. This is usually achieved using costly fluoro-crown glasses, abnormal flint glasses, and even optically transparent liquids with highly unusual dispersive properties in the thin spaces between glass elements. The temperature dependence of glass and liquid index of refraction and dispersion must be accounted for during apochromat design to assure good optical performance over reasonable temperature ranges with only slight re-focusing. In some cases, apochromatic designs without anomalous dispersion glasses are possible.

== Use in photography ==
Independent tests can be used to demonstrate that the "APO" designation is used rather loosely by some photographic lens manufacturers to describe the color accuracy of their lenses, as comparable lenses have shown superior color accuracy even though they did not carry the "APO" designation.

Also, when considering lens design, the "APO" designation is used more conservatively in astronomy-related optics (e.g. telescopes) and microscopy than in photography. For example, telescopes that are marked "APO" are specialized, fixed focal length lenses that are optimised for infinity-like distances whereas in photography, even certain relatively low-priced general-purpose zoom lenses are given the APO designation.

Often, however, apochromatic lenses used in fine cameras are not termed apochromats, Instead, they may be simply called "fluorite lenses", based on the material with anomalous partial dispersion which allowed them to be apochromatic. Such lenses began to be available to photographers in 1969, with the Canon FL-F 300mm f/5.6 telephoto lens. Fluorite has some drawbacks, for example vulnerability to sudden changes in temperature, and thus attempts were made to use substitutes, such as fluorophosphate glasses, which ameliorate, but do not eliminate (as compared with ordinary glass) these drawbacks.

== See also ==
Focus error for four types of lens, over the visible and near infrared spectrum.

- Superachromat
- Fluorite lens
- List of telescope types
