= Heinrich Erfle =

German optician and inventor (1884–1923)

Heinrich Erfle (April 1, 1884, Dürkheim – April 8, 1923, Jena) was a German optician who spent most of his career at Carl Zeiss. In 1917 he invented the first wide-field eyepieces for telescopes and binoculars. During his short life he developed a number of new designs for telescopes and eyepieces. Erfle died at the age of 39 from an infection after he "accidentally stabbed himself in the leg with a fountain pen and did not pay attention to the wound." After Erfle's death, his patent applications were filed by Rudolph Straubel for the benefit of Erfle's family.

== Education ==
Heinrich Erfle studied at the Ludwig-Maximilians-Universität München and the Technical University of Munich (TUM), from which he graduated in 1907 with a thesis on "Optical properties and electron theory." His dissertation advisers were Wilhelm Ebert and Sebastian Finsterwalder.

== Career ==
After a two-year residency at the TUM he began working at C.A. Steinheil & Sons.

In 1909 he joined the telescope division of Carl Zeiss, in Jena, Germany. He began to run the division in 1918. During his years there, he focused mainly on improving submarine periscopes as well as the scopes on shotguns, prism binoculars, and guns on naval vessels.

Erfle is particularly well known for his introduction of wide-angle eyepieces, which he began to produce during the First World War for military use.

Erfle eyepieces are relatively cheap to produce, and are still produced for many binoculars as well as for telescopes used by amateur astronomers.

The book Classic Telescopes describes Erfle as a “famous Zeiss employee...who in 1921 patented a practical design for a wide-angle ocular. Erfles usually consist of five elements comprising two achromatic doublets, with a convex singlet element sandwiched in between,” and “are designed to have a wide field of view (about 60 degrees) but suffer from astigmatism and ghosting, especially in the shorter focal lengths.” Still, “Erfles remain quite popular owing to their large eye lenses and good eye relief.”

“The basic Erfle”, according to an overview of “Common Telescope Eyepiece Designs”, “uses five elements in three groups and delivers a wide apparent field of view of about 60-degrees. Erfle variations are also made with six elements in three groups...Erfles have a nice, flat field from edge to edge, although sharpness and contrast is slightly inferior to the Orthoscopic and Plossl designs” by Ernst Abbe and Simon Plössl respectively. “They also feature long eye relief, especially important for eyeglass wearers. This combination of features makes these oculars excellent for wide sky viewing of open clusters, star fields, etc.”

The design for Erfle's wide-angle eyepiece for Carl Zeiss was patented in the U.S. (patent number 1,478,704) on December 25, 1923. The patent application, for “a new and useful Ocular”, describes “oculars comprising two lenses, each of which consists of a collective and of a dispersive member, and which are so disposed that the two dispersive members lie outermost, hence, that of the double lens to be turned towards the incident light the dispersive member, and of the double lens to be turned towards the eye the collective member lies foremost”. Between these lenses lies “a single collective lens”. This combination of lenses attains “a diminution of the defects in the images, especially of the astigmatism and of the distortion, to the extent that the field of view may be raised to comparatively large angles, amounting to about 70 degrees. This was not feasible in oculars hitherto in use, if the image was to be of the same quality”.

Erfle also held U.S. patent number 1,479,229 (patent date January 1, 1924) for “a new and useful Eyelens System” which includes “four member eye-lens systems in which every two members, one made of glass of smaller and one of glass of greater refractive index, are cemented together”, and are “so arranged that the cemented surfaces always turn their respective concave side towards the incident light, and that of each pair lenses that lens which consists of glass of smaller refractive index faces the incident light”. The result is a system “in which the angles of incidence of the rays of light...become in no place excessively large, so that with systems corresponding to the invention...a correction of the astigmatism and of the distortion as well as of the spherical aberrations may in a sufficient measure be attained”.

He held U.S. patent number 1,505,878 for “a new and useful Telescope” with a prism system containing “two lateral boundary surfaces, parallel to each other and an optional number of reflecting surfaces, inclined to these boundary surfaces”. This makes it possible to look “in two different directions in succession.”

He also held U.S. patent number 1,507,111 (September 2, 1924) for “a new and useful Lens System for Galilean Telescopes”. In previous lens systems for Galilean telescopes, “the elimination of the image defects was generally confined to the removal of the chromatic longitudinal aberration and the chromatic difference in magnification as well as to the elimination of the astigmatism for a certain definite locus of the eye”. But “a faultless image outside the axis can only be attained by simultaneously eliminating for the whole telescope the spherical longitudinal aberration and the condition of sine”. These requirements were fulfilled by the invention in question, in which the astigmatic difference no longer depended “so largely from the locus of the eye, as such has been the case in the Galilean telescopes hitherto known”. This was achieved by “making the objective consist of two collective members, each of which is composed of two cemented lenses, of which the one having the lower refractive index is facing the incident light, and by composing the ocular of three cemented lenses, the inner one being a flint lens”.

Up to the present day, Erfle's patents have continued to be cited in later patent applications by other scientists.

== Books ==
- Erfle, Heinrich (1907) Optische Eigenschaften und Elektronentheorie. Dissertation, Technical University of Munich. 83 pp.
- Czapski, Siegfried (1924) Grundzüge der Theorie der optischen Instrumente nach Abbe. 3rd edition edited by H. Erfle and H. Boegehold. Leipzig, Barth. 479 pp.

== Scientific papers ==
- Erfle, Heinrich (1920) Über die durch ein Drehkeilpaar erzeugte Ablenkung und über eine als Kennzeichen für die Beibehaltung des "Hauptschnittes“ dienende Sinusbedingung. Mitteilung aus der optischen Werkstätte von Carl Zeiß in Jena. Zeitschrift für Physik. A Hadrons and Nuclei Vol. 1, No. 1, pp. 57–81. DOI: 10.1007/BF01881027
