= Carl Kellner =

Carl Kellner may refer to:

- Carl Kellner (optician) (1826–1855), German inventor of the "Kellner eyepiece"
- Carl Kellner (mystic) (1851–1905), Austrian chemist and mystic
