= Bayfordbury Observatory =

Observatory in Hertfordshire, England

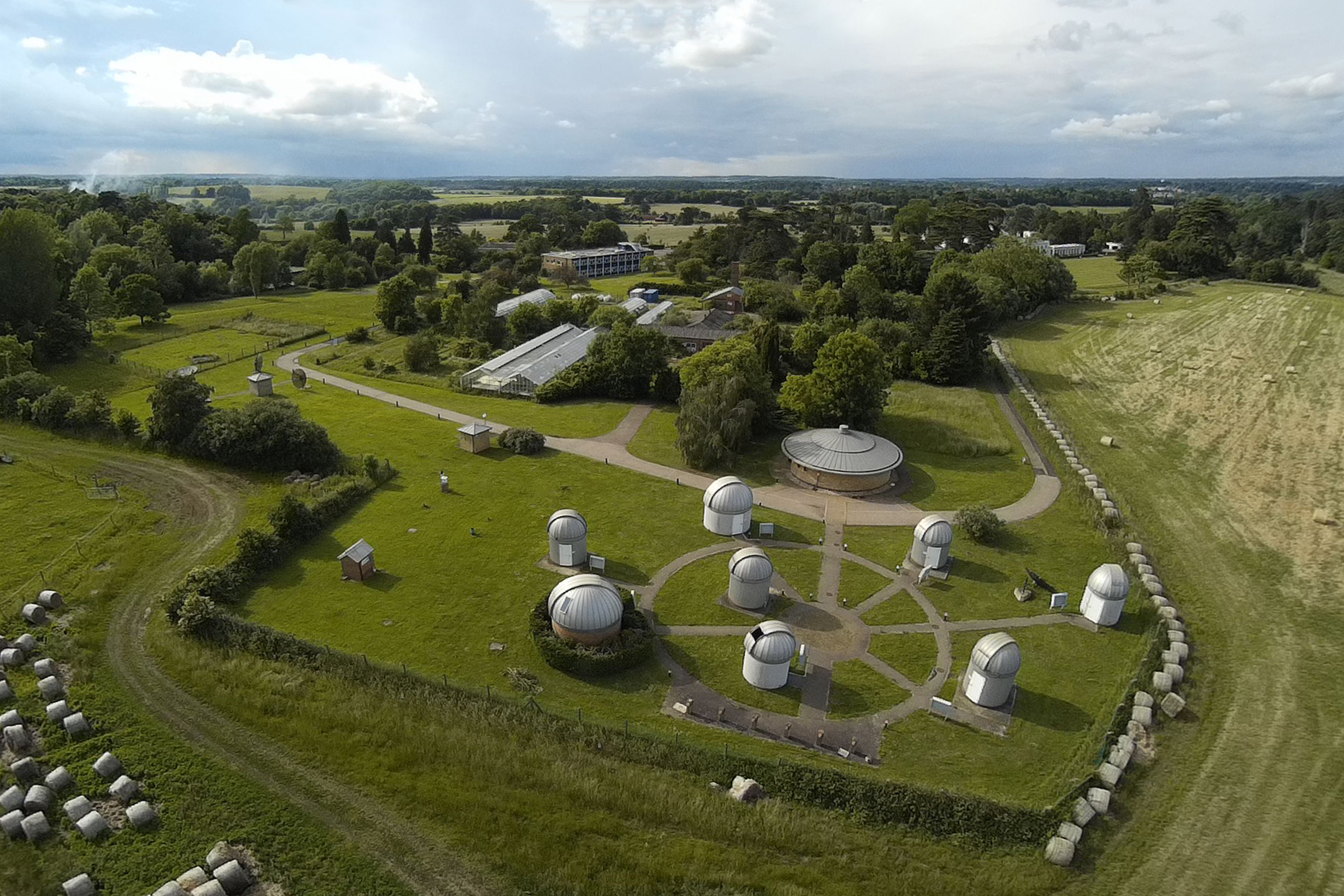
- Optical domes of the observatory
- Organization: University of Hertfordshire
- Observatory code: J33
- Location: Hertfordshire, United Kingdom
- Coordinates: 51°46′30″N 00°05′40″W
- Altitude: 66 metres (217 ft)
- Established: 1969
- Website: Bayfordbury Observatory

Telescopes
- 60cm Telescope: Planewave CDK24
- J.C.D. Marsh Telescope: 20" Cassegrain
- C.R. Kitchin Telescope: Robotic 16" Meade LX200GPS
- I.K.M. Nicolson Telescope: Robotic 16" Meade LX200
- R. Priddey Telescope: Robotic 16" Meade LX200-ACF
- J. Hough Telescope: Robotic 16" Meade LX200-ACF
- R.W. Forrest Telescope: 4.5m radio telescope
- Vince Telescope: 1860s 6.75" refractor
- Related media on Commons

Bayfordbury Observatory is the University of Hertfordshire's astronomical and atmospheric physics remote sensing observatory, and one of the largest teaching observatories in the UK. It is located in the relatively dark countryside of Bayfordbury, Hertfordshire, 6 miles from the main university campus in Hatfield. The first telescope was built in 1969, and since then has been used as a teaching observatory for undergraduate students, staff and student research as well as for public outreach activities.

== History ==
The first telescope, a 16-inch Newtonian/Cassegrain telescope, was built on the site in 1969, one year after astronomy was first taught at the Hatfield Polytechnic. In 1970 the observatory was formally opened by Richard van der Riet Woolley, then Astronomer Royal. Over the years the number of telescopes has increased along with the size of astronomy department.

On the 30th anniversary in 2000, the observatory underwent a large renovation. Three new telescope domes and a 4.5m radio telescope were built, as well as a control building, opened and named after Sir Patrick Moore, from where the computer-controlled telescopes can be operated and images analysed.

== Astronomical observatory ==
The observatory has seven permanently mounted main optical telescopes, the first being the 20-inch J.C.D Marsh Cassegrain Telescope, and the largest is a Planewave CDK24 24-inch telescope. The other telescopes include four equatorially mounted, robotic 16-inch Meade LX200s as well as a 14-inch Meade LX200. These telescopes are equipped with research-grade CCD and CMOS cameras, spectrographs and video cameras. A number of smaller telescopes are co-mounted to the main telescopes to act as guidescopes, widefield telescopes or H-alpha solar telescopes.

As well as using optical wavelengths, the observatory also has extensive radio astronomy capabilities. The largest radio telescope is the 4.5m R.W. Forrest telescope which is used for receiving the 21cm Hydrogen line and continuum emission. A further three 3m radio telescopes are soon to operate together as a 115 metre baseline interferometer.

A nearby university science building houses a planetarium used during open evenings and groups visits. The roof of the building hosts a number of the observatory's sensing equipment including a Sky Quality Meter for quantifying levels of light pollution, a coelostat for observing the Sun, and day and night-time all-sky cameras - two of six the university operates throughout the UK.

The university organises a variety of public outreach events including monthly open evenings from October till March and group visits for school classes and community groups.

== Atmospheric physics remote sensing ==
Since 2010 the observatory has also grown to serve as a remote sensing station for the university's Centre for Atmospheric & Instrumentation Research. A former telescope dome now houses a remotely operable mount with a micropulse LIDAR/ceilometer, ultra-sensitive Sun polarimeter and a cirrus-detecting infrared pyrometer, with further plans to add an infrared spectropolarimeter in the near-future.

The roof of the nearby science building also hosts an automatic Sun photometer and lunar photometer as part of the NASA AERONET network, a scanning infrared radiometer, a pyrgeometer and pyranometer, as well as day and night-time all-sky cameras.

== Gallery ==
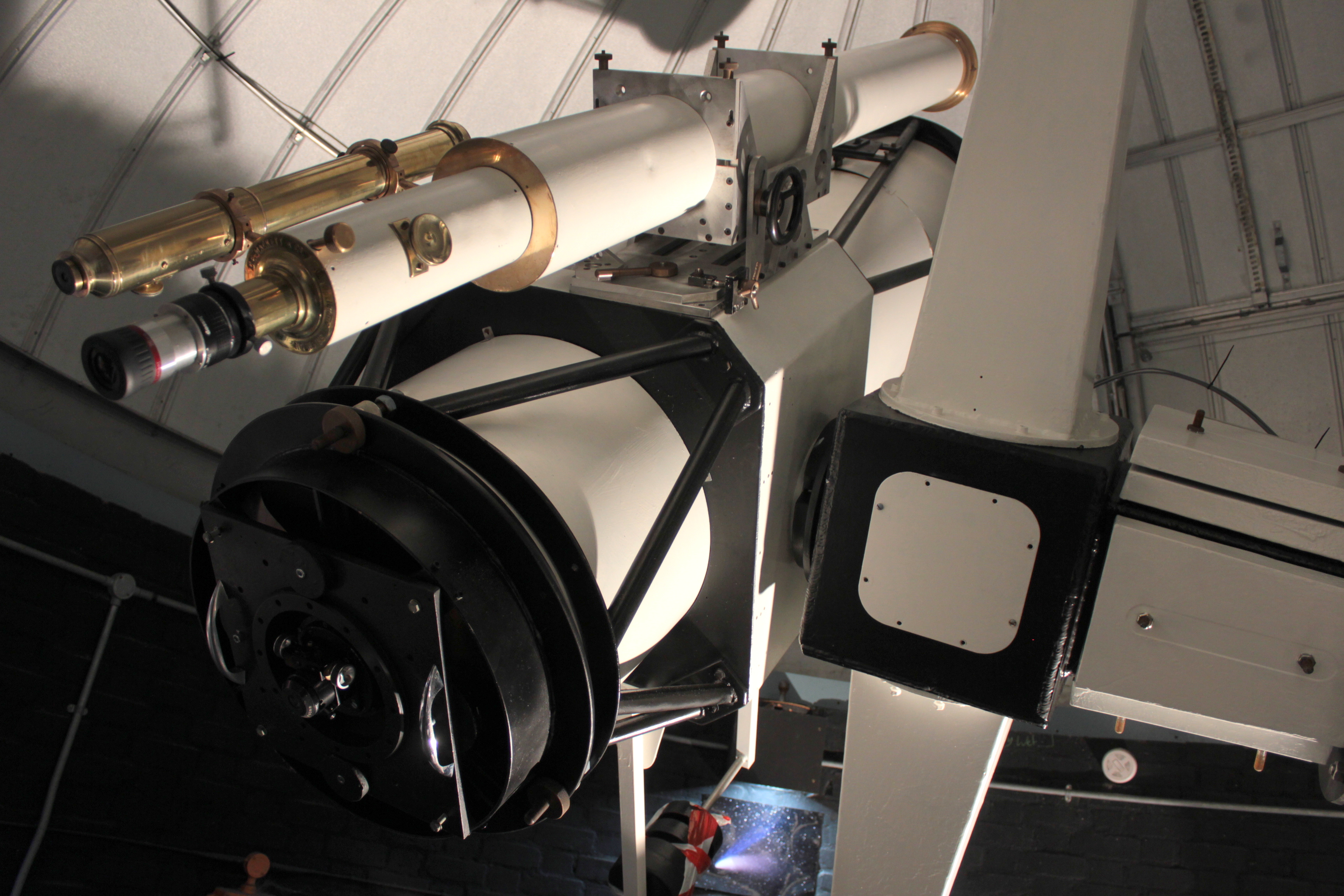
20" Marsh Telescope

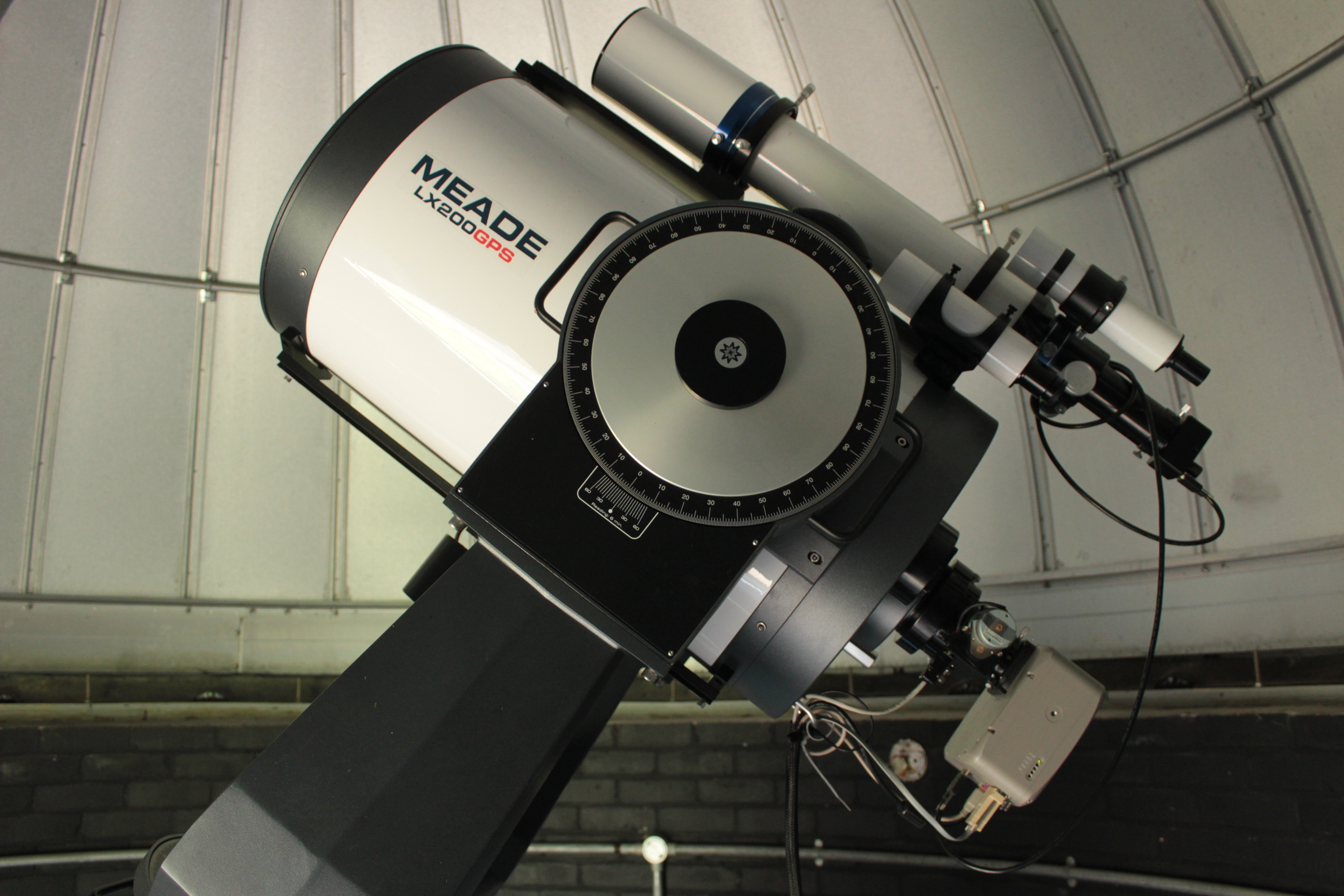
Kitchin Telescope

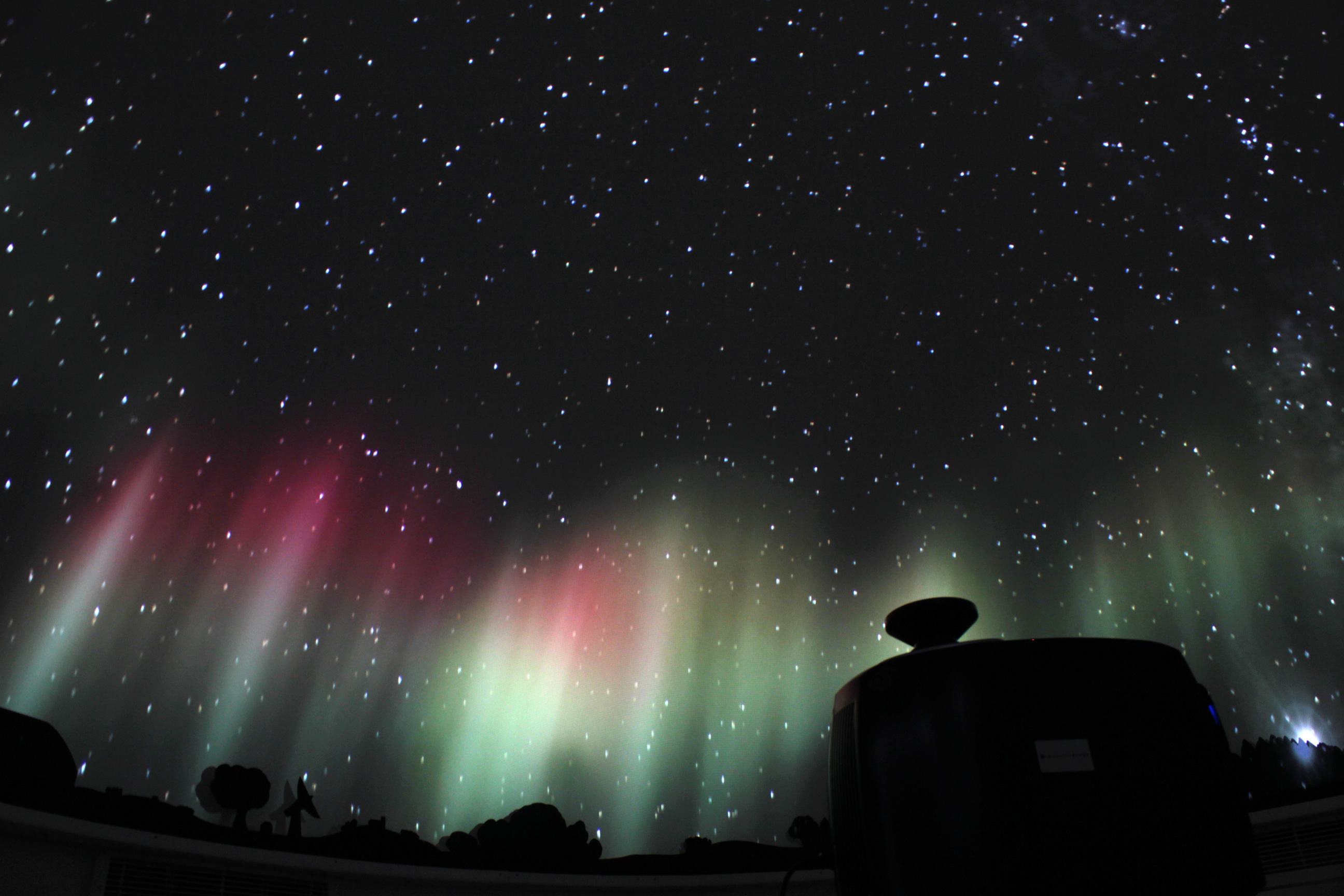
The planetarium at Bayfordbury

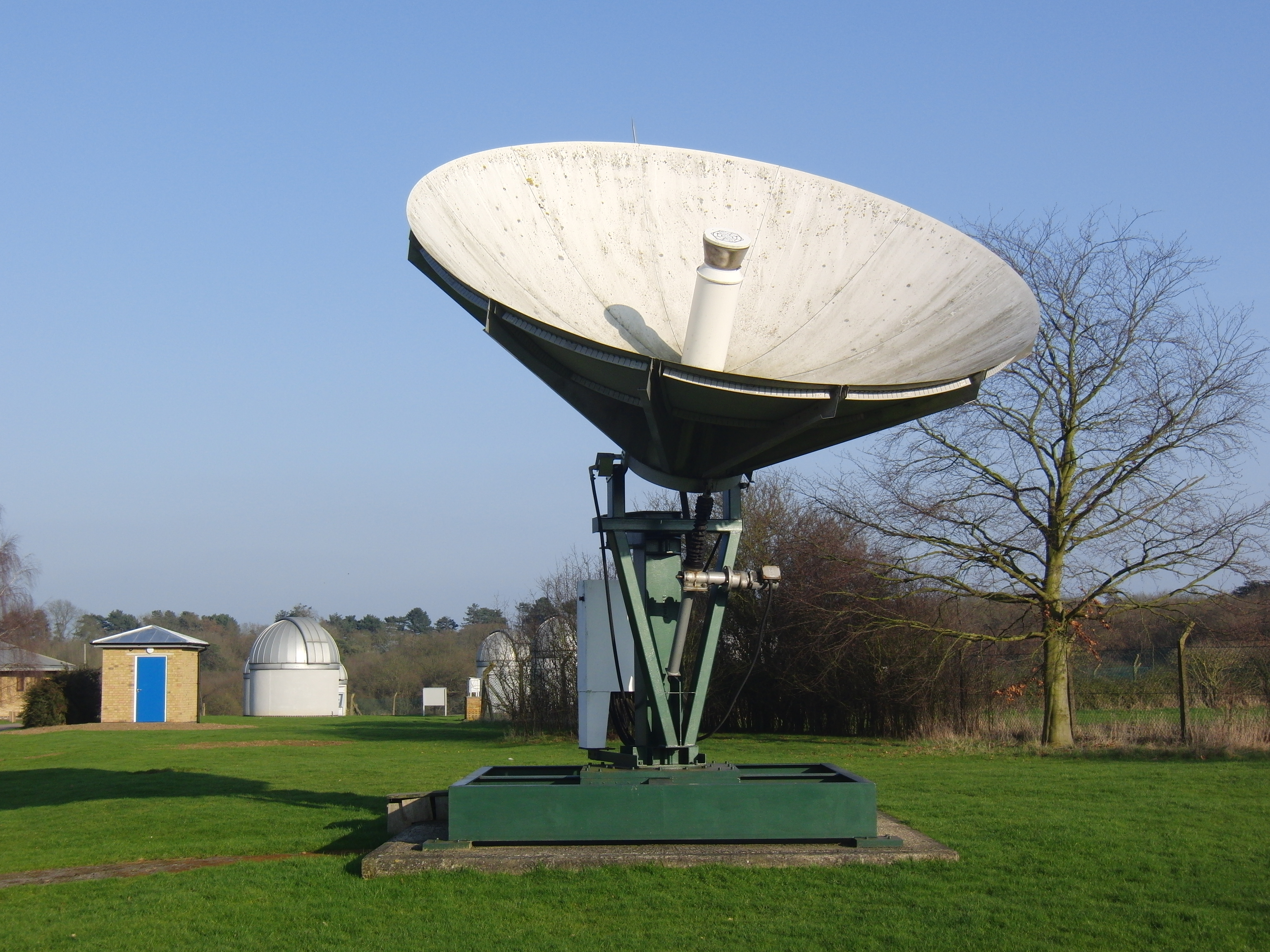
The 4.5m R.W. Forrest radio telescope

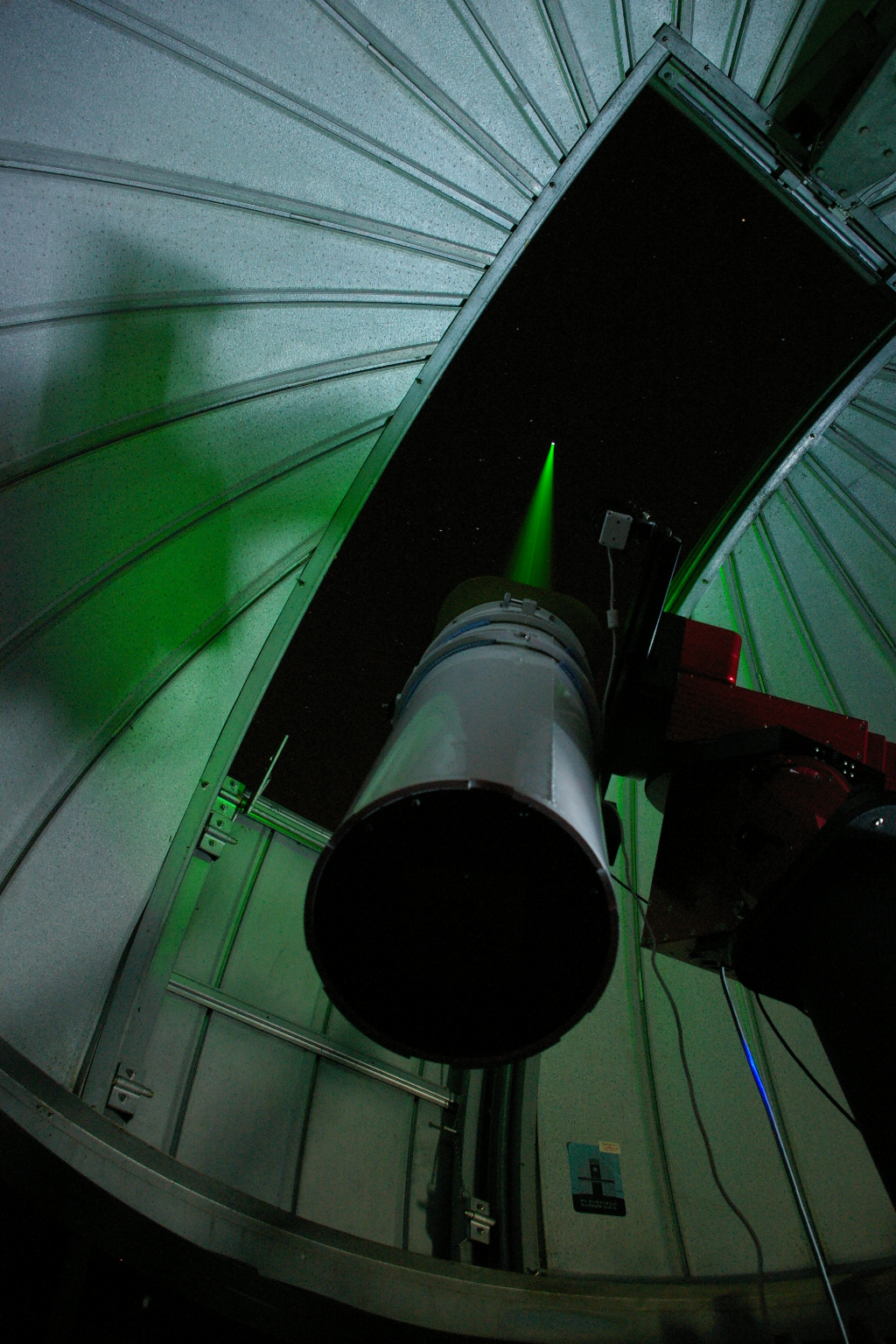
The micropulse LIDAR
