= Tele Vue =

Astronomical optics company

Tele Vue Optics
- Founded: 1977; 49 years ago
- Founder: Al Nagler (1935-2025)
- Headquarters: Chester, New York, United States
- Website: televue.com

Tele Vue Optics is a Chester, New York-based astronomical optics company known primarily for its premium brand of speciality eyepieces and apochromatic refractor telescopes. Founded in 1977 by Al Nagler, an optical engineer from The Bronx who designed simulators used in the Apollo program, the company originally made projection lenses for large projection-screen televisions, but is well known in the astronomy community for its products.

Prior to October 1, 2006, Tele Vue's corporate headquarters has also served as the primary distribution point for Vixen America, a subsidiary of the Japan-based Vixen corporation, with the two companies building equipment that are compatible with each other, especially the Tele Vue refractor with Vixen's "sphinx" "go-to" mount. Although the company is no longer the principal distributor, Vixen America still maintains its address at Tele Vue's New York location.

== Refractor telescopes ==
Tele Vue once manufactured a 5" refracting telescope named the MPT, the Multi-Purpose Telescope. It had a fast f/4 ratio, and had an adjustable diaphragm that ranged from f/4 to f/20. Only a small number were made, with the last being kept by Tele Vue to use as a final optical quality control for all eyepieces they make. Recent examples of this telescope have sold for well into 5 figures.

Today, Tele Vue's apochromatic refractor telescopes, which have reduced chromatic aberration, come in diameters ranging from 60mm (2.4 inches) to 127mm (5 inches). The imaging system ("is" series) telescopes are designed primarily for astrophotography.

== Eyepieces ==
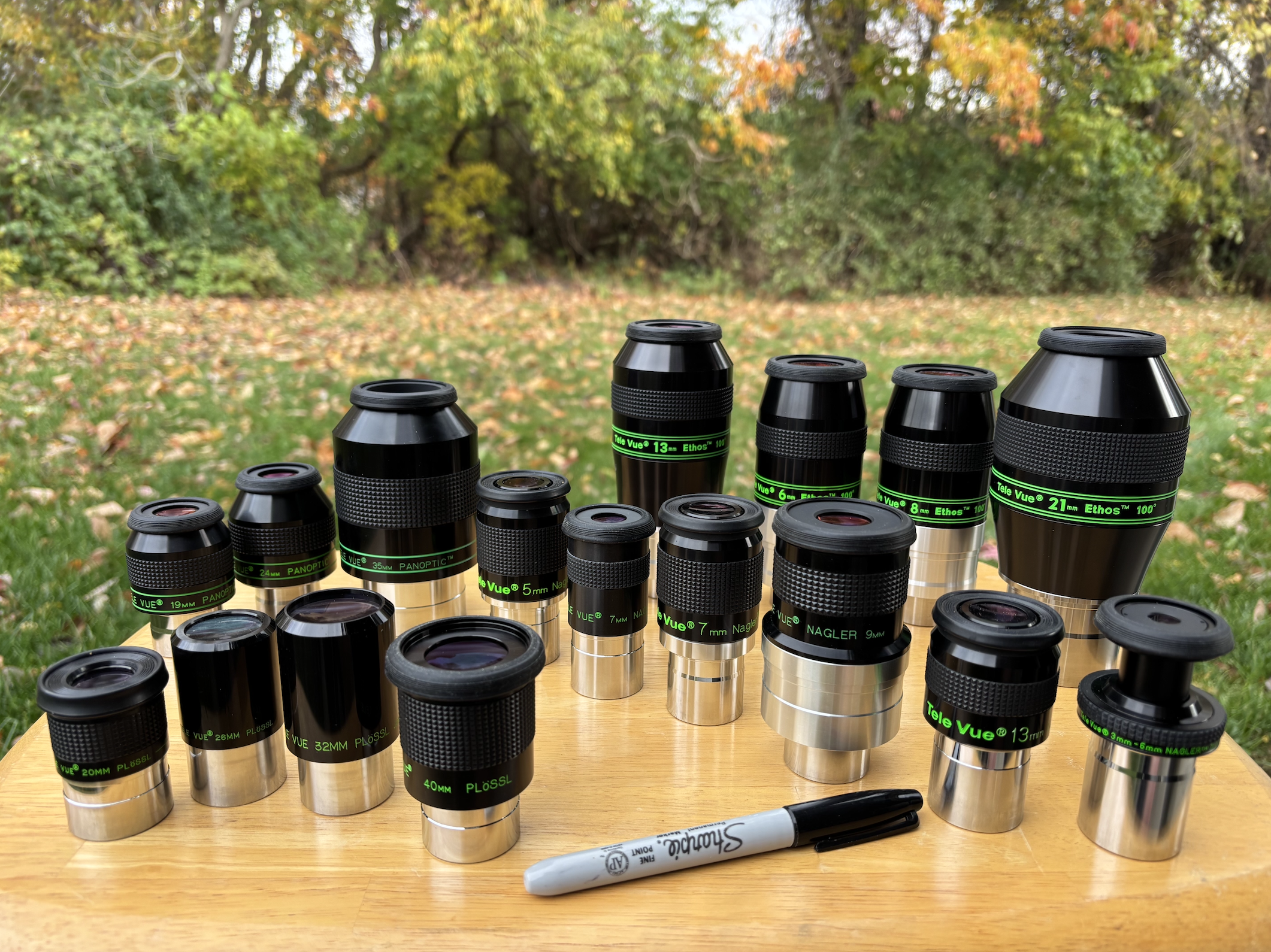
Tele Vue eyepieces are made distinct by their bright-green lettering.

The Tele Vue range includes Plossl, Nagler, and zoom eyepieces. They started with a variety of Plossl eyepieces for amateur astronomers. The introduction of the original Nagler 13 mm Type 1 in 1982 with its wide field of view and an equally high price soon made their mark. Using different combinations of lenses of different types of high index optical glasses, the eyepieces produce, respectively, a 50°, 62°, 68°, 72°, 82°, 100°, and 110° apparent field-of-view. Tele Vue marketing calls the 82°, 100°, and 110° apparent fields-of-view a "spacewalk" experience or a "porthole in space". Wider apparent fields of view are helpful in viewing star clusters, galaxies and nebulae, especially large emission nebulae like the Orion Nebula, but the real reason for wide fields of view is to allow the same true field of view as is found in a lower power, narrower apparent FOV eyepiece. This increases effective contrast and aids in visibility of certain details.

Additionally, Tele Vue eyepieces are well corrected for most aberrations, providing edge to edge pinpoint stars, and are well suited to use in popular "fast" (Note: Telescopes with a lower focal ratio are considered to be "faster".) telescopes. The most expensive Tele Vue eyepiece is the Ethos line, which consists of eight eyepieces known for excellent image quality and ultra-wide 100 degree fields, which can retail for from US$500–US$800 or higher. At the 2010 North East Astronomy Forum they revealed the Ethos SX, a 3.7 mm focal length eyepiece with an even greater 110° apparent field-of-view. In 2011, a new line of eyepieces was introduced called the Delos. These eyepieces are based on the Ethos but have a smaller field of view of 72°. The reduced FOV allows them to give a comfortable 20 mm eye relief.

Because of the many component lenses and wide aperatures of Tele View eyepieces some are quite large and heavy, compared to conventional eyepieces; owners ruefully refer to them as "hand grenades" because of their size and shape. Some Tele Vue eyepieces are over half a foot long and weigh over two pounds.

== Mounts ==
Tele Vue sells several alt-azimuth mounts and tripods.

== Accessories ==
Tele Vue also manufactures special nebula filters, Barlow lenses, special image amplifiers known as Powermates, the "Paracorr" coma-corrector for "fast" (f/5 and below) Newtonian telescopes, and the "Dioptrx," a special lens that fits over most Tele Vue eyepieces to correct eyesight astigmatism.

In 2019, Tele Vue partnered with the Tactical Night Vision Company to offer a Night Vision System for astronomical observing.
