= Al Nagler =

American optical designer and amateur astronomer (1935–2025)

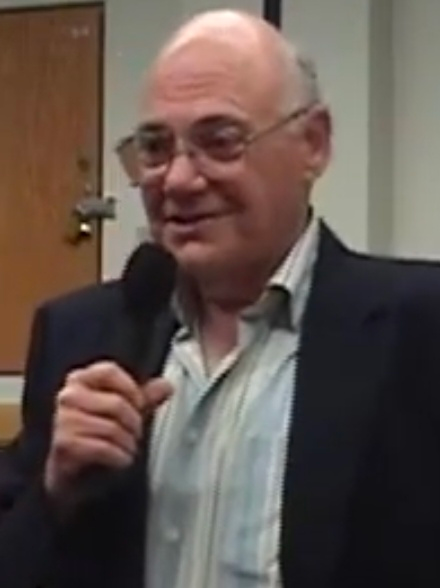
- Nagler in 2005
- Born: Albert Hirsch Nagler; May 22, 1935; New York City, U.S.
- Died: October 27, 2025 (aged 90); Chester, New York, U.S.
- Education: City College of New York
- Occupations: Optical designer; astronomy equipment and telescope retailer
- Spouse: Judith Pearlman (m. 1961)
- Children: 2

Albert Hirsch Nagler (May 22, 1935 – October 27, 2025) was an American optical designer and amateur astronomer who was the founder of Tele Vue Optics and inventor of the Nagler eyepiece. Nagler also worked in the Apollo program and built simulators used to train astronauts. Nagler was a prominent figure in the amateur astronomy community.

Asteroid 10715 was named for Nagler in 1993.

== Early life and education ==
As a child in New York City, Nagler had interests in art and science. He owned a small telescope and was a teenage member of the "Junior Astronomy Club" sponsored by the Hayden Planetarium. Nagler later enrolled in the Bronx High School of Science with the goal of building a telescope. In the Scientific Techniques "shop" class taught by Charles Cafarella, Nagler ground an 8-inch mirror and constructed a reflecting telescope. Nagler exhibited this telescope at the 1958 Vermont Stellafane Convention and won a third place prize. He wrote an article for the December 1955 edition of Mechanix Illustrated detailing the construction of the telescope.

After high school graduation, Nagler worked a variety of jobs in machining, chemicals, and drafting. He also took night classes for 16 years at the City College of New York and graduated with a BS in physics in 1969.

Nagler met Judith "Judi" Pearlman in 1959, and they married in June 1961. Judi worked as a grade school teacher until the birth of their son David. She was also TeleVue's first employee.

== Career ==
=== Farrand Optical and NASA ===
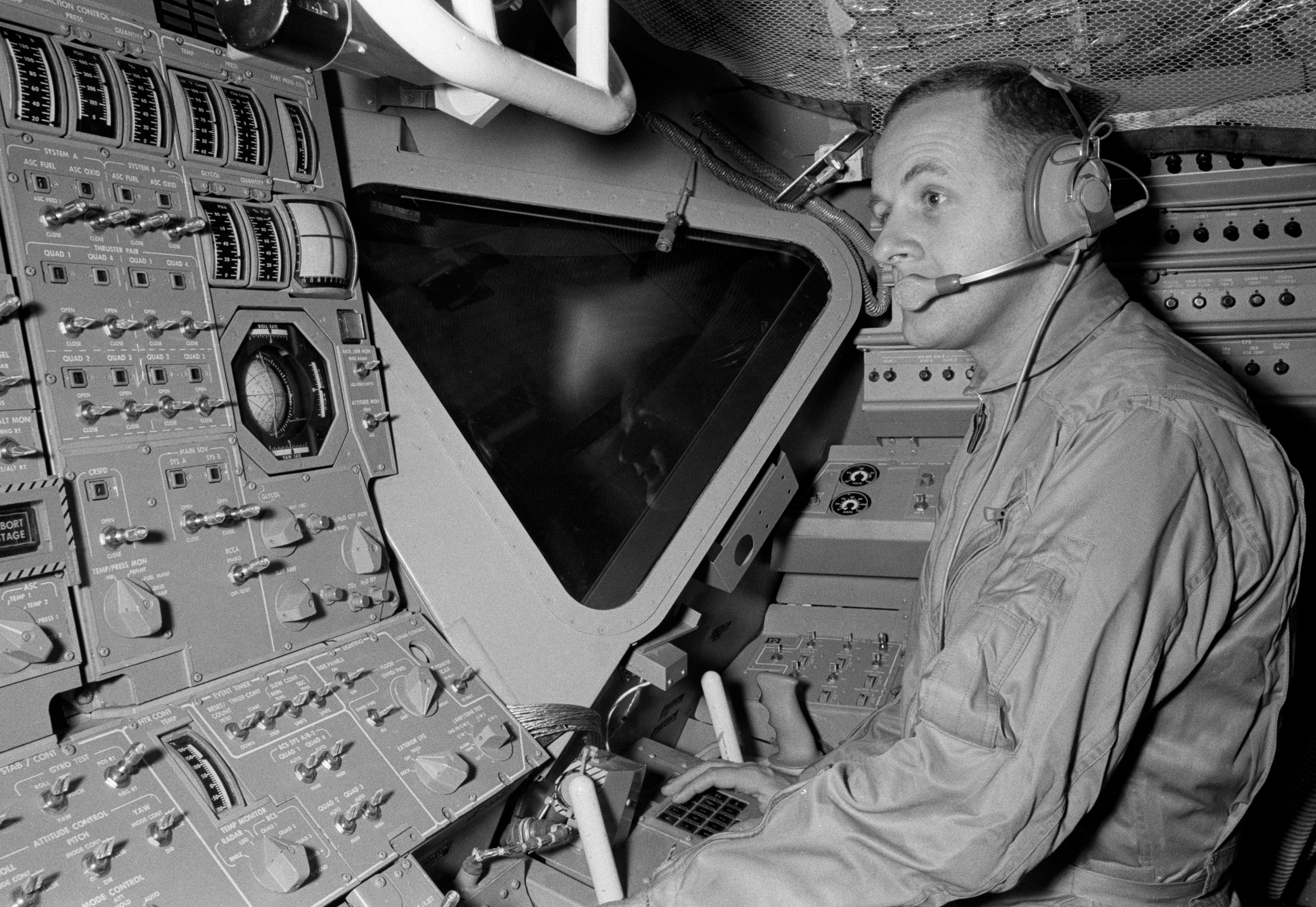
Astronaut Philip K. Chapman in the Lunar Module simulator, 1968. Note the triangle-shaped window.

Utilizing a contact from the amateur astronomy community, Nagler obtained a job with Farrand Optical as a draftsperson. Nagler worked at Farrand until 1973 and achieved the level of senior optical systems designer.

Under contract with Grumman Aerospace Corp. and NASA, Nagler and Farrand Optical designed "Infinity Display" system simulators for the NASA astronauts. The systems projected images to the Apollo Lunar Module training device by using six foot mirrors and giant lenses covering the triangular windows of the Lunar Module. Nagler used ball bearings as stars in a spherical map projected via camera to the module as well as an intricately sculpted moon map. The astronaut could use both eyes to see the displays projected onto the triangular Lunar Module windows. In a blog post, Nagler described this system as a "giant eyepiece that swallows spacecraft", and this system was also demonstrated in the movie Apollo 13. This experience in building wide angle projection displays was inspirational in Nagler's later development of the 82° Nagler eyepiece.

=== Keystone Camera Company and Ambi-Tech ===
After receiving his physics degree in 1969, Nagler left Farrand and worked as chief optical engineer for Keystone Camera Co. Nagler traveled to Japan as part of his work with Keystone and made valuable contacts in the Japanese optics industry. Nagler left Keystone in 1976 and worked with a friend from Farrand, Matt Baum, to found Ambi-Tech, a company that would concentrate on building safety mechanisms for woodworking devices. Nagler worked with Ambi-Tech for twenty years. During this time, Nagler founded TeleVue Optics and ran it as a part-time business.

=== TeleVue Optics ===
In 1977, Nagler and his wife Judi established TeleVue Optics in Spring Valley, New York (later, TeleVue would relocate to Pearl River, New York, Suffern, New York, and eventually Chester, New York). TeleVue is a family business. Nagler's son David joined TeleVue in 1998. David's wife Sandy took over Judi Nagler's duties when she retired in 2008. David Nagler majored in communications at Syracuse University and promotes TeleVue via advertising, marketing, and internet.

Nagler named the company TeleVue as an abbreviation of "television viewing" and "telescope viewing". One part of the business originally focused on projection televisions. At the 1977 Consumer Electronics Show, the projection lens system was billed as 'NASA Scientist Designs Projection TV Lens', and in 1978 science retailer Edmund Scientific sold Nagler's "5-inch super projection lens" in its catalog.

TeleVue specializes in industry standard eyepieces and telescopes.

==== Eyepieces ====
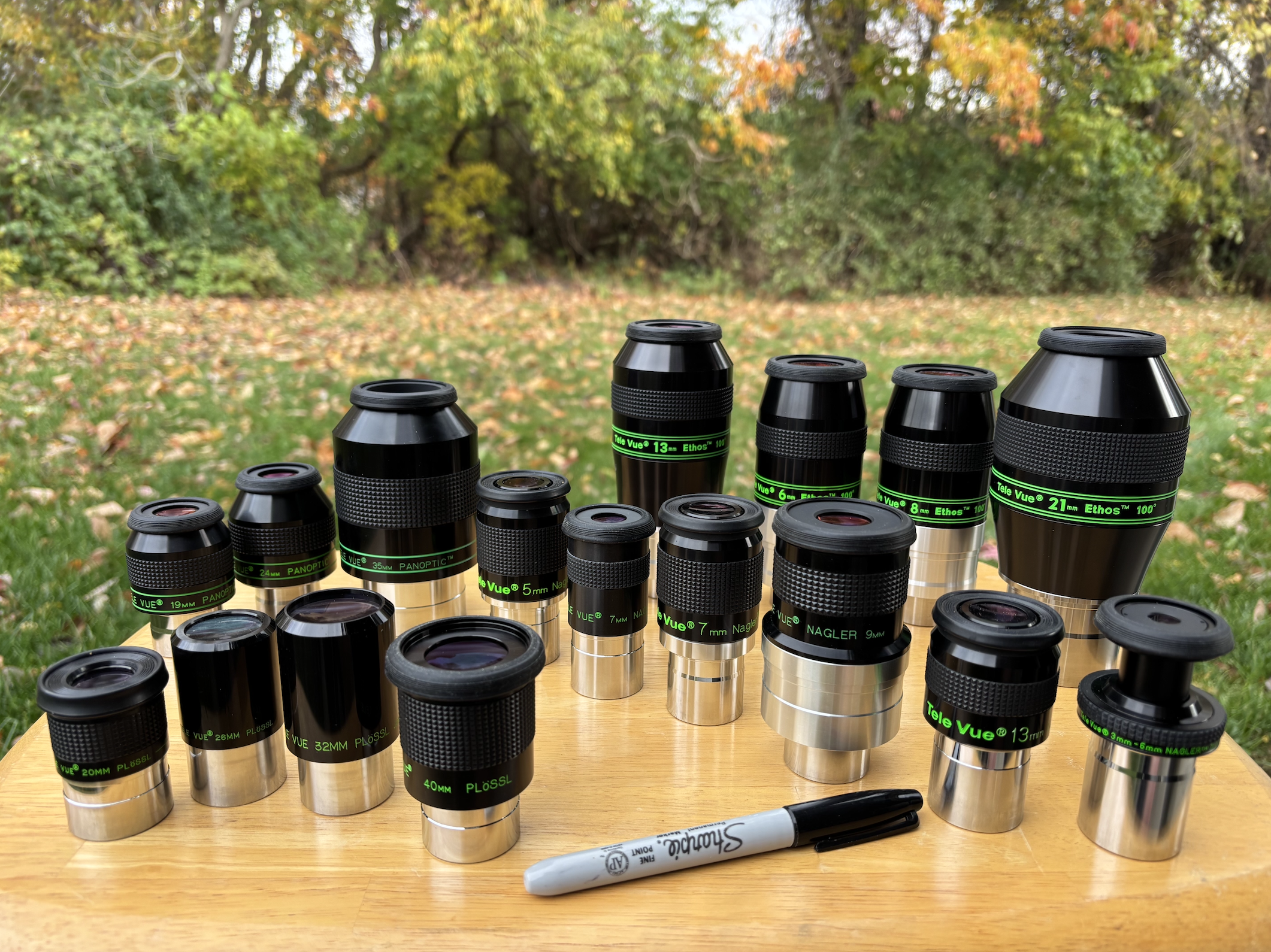
TeleVue eyepieces. Row 1: 20 mm, 26 mm, 32 mm, 40 mm Plössls. Row 2: 19 mm, 24 mm, 35 mm Panoptics. 5 mm Nagler T6, 7 mm Nagler T1, 7 mm Nagler T6, 9 mm Nagler T1, 13 mm Nagler T6, Nagler 3-6 mm Planetary Zoom. Row 3: 13 mm, 6 mm, 8 mm, 21 mm Ethos.

By 1979, Nagler designed his first eyepiece, a wide-field telescope eyepiece termed the "Nagler". Compared to other eyepieces, the view through a Nagler eyepiece is more expansive and appears to wrap more around your vision. As an observer, Nagler enjoyed low magnification "rich field" viewing of extended "deep sky" objects such as galaxies, star clusters, and nebulae, and the Nagler eyepiece was meant to produce such experiences. After obtaining exposure and market share with a line of TeleVue Plössl eyepieces, Nagler released the first ultrawide Nagler eyepiece, the 13 mm Nagler, in 1980. The introduction of the 13 mm Nagler eyepiece is considered a benchmark in amateur astronomy. It was the first eyepiece to provide an 82° wide field with sharp images all the way out to the edge of view. The eyepiece also coincided with the introduction of the Dobsonian reflecting telescope. This telescope design made it easier to mount large telescope mirrors, and amateur astronomers became accustomed to observing dim deep sky objects such as galaxies, star clusters, and nebulae. Nagler eyepieces are well-designed for observing such large, dim, and extended objects.

Highlights of the Nagler line are the 20mm Type 2 released in 1986 and the 31 mm Type 5 released in 1999. The 20 mm (now discontinued) featured a 2" barrel and weighed 2.3 lbs. In Tele Vue ads, a miniature Nagler was shown leaning against the side of the 20mm Nagler. The 31 mm Nagler, featuring a 2" barrel and weighing 2.2 lbs, is referred to as the "Terminagler" eyepiece.

TeleVue would introduce other eyepiece lines such as the Radian and Panoptic. In 2006, David Nagler and TeleVue optical designer Paul Dellachiaie developed a 100° apparent field eyepiece. David named the new eyepiece line Ethos, and the first product was a 13 mm eyepiece, the 13 mm Ethos, which was meant to acknowledge and draw comparison to the original 13 mm Nagler. The 13mm Ethos provides 50% more apparent field than the 82° Nagler. TeleVue introduced two additional eyepiece series that were influenced by work on the Ethos line, the 72° Delos and 62° DeLite.

Nagler wrote an article that was published in the July 2006 issue of Sky & Telescope Magazine. "How to Choose Your Telescope Magnification" was viewed as helpful in guiding consumer purchases of specific telescope and eyepiece combinations. In particular, Nagler claimed that refracting telescopes had no lower limit of magnification unlike telescopes with a central obstruction such as catadioptrics (Schmidt-Cassegrain) and Newtonian reflectors.

==== Telescopes ====
Nagler first built a telescope, an 8" Newtonian reflector, in 1955 while a high school student in the Bronx. This instrument was later upgraded to a 350 lb, 12", f/5 optical system, and Nagler won a first place prize for this telescope at the Stellafane Convention in 1972.

In 1981, Nagler constructed the "Multi-Purpose Telescope", a 5", f/4 refracting telescope. The MPT spawned the production and evolution of TeleVue's flagship 4" apochromatic telescope line, which would experience various name changes and eventually culminate in the "Nagler-Petzval" (NP) series. All of these telescopes would offer two-inch focusers and diagonals and be based on the four-lens Petzval design providing color-free viewing with the ability to change from low power, wide field observing to high magnification views of the moon and planets. Nagler also introduced smaller aperture apochromatic refracting telescopes such as the Oracle and the Pronto. Later offerings such as the TeleVue-60 and TeleVue-85 employ a doublet (two lens) apochromatic objective lens assembly.

In May 2002, TeleVue became the North American distributor of Vixen Optics telescopes and astronomical equipment. Vixen is a Japanese optics company that was started in 1949. Vixen had established a name by providing well-made German equatorial telescope mounts along with various telescopes and eyepieces. Distribution of Vixen Optics telescopes and equipment was later taken over by Company Seven of Montpelier, Maryland.

== Retirement and legacy ==
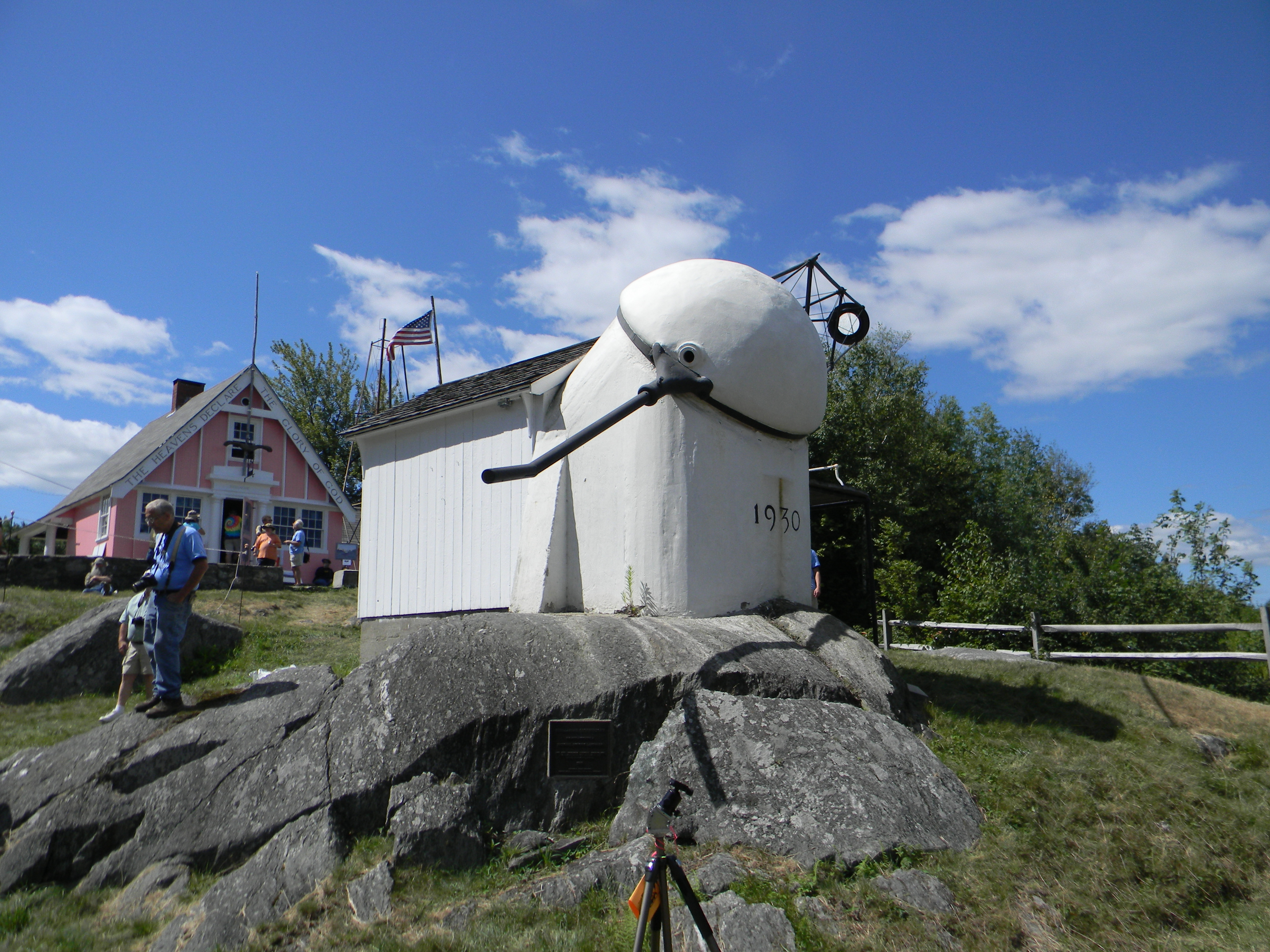
Stellafane Observatory (pictured in 2010)

Nagler retired in 2005 and his son David assumed the presidency of TeleVue. Nagler spent his retirement traveling to star parties and meeting other amateur astronomers. In 2009, Nagler met astronaut Alan Bean at the Stellafane Telescope Maker's Convention where he was a keynote speaker. Bean had trained in Nagler's simulator during the Apollo moon landing program. Nagler was awarded the 2025 Astronomical League Award at that year's Stellafane convention.

In March 2025, just a few weeks before Nagler's 90th birthday, the PUNCH (Polarimeter to Unify the Corona and Heliosphere) constellation of satellites was launched. The four satellites feature a TeleVue designed objective lens in each Wide Field Imager camera. The satellites were developed to study features of the solar corona. This was the first time that TeleVue optics have been sent into space. In 2009, a TeleVue NP101 refracting telescope had been used as an observing instrument in Antarctica with the ASTEP (Antarctic Search for Transiting ExoPlanets) initiative to discover exoplanets from a south pole location.

In an interview published in the Summer 1995 issue of Amateur Astronomy, Nagler stated that his work on eyepieces and telescopes had two major goals: “to make astronomy as easy and versatile as possible to encourage, rather than discourage, newcomers, and secondly, to provide a visual experience as close to a “spacewalk” as possible by obtaining the widest, sharpest, highest contrast views."

Nagler died at the office of Televue in Chester, New York, on October 27, 2025, at the age of 90. His service was held at a chapel in New Jersey.

Asteroid 10715 was discovered by astronomer Brian Skiff in 1983 at Lowell Observatory. Skiff named the asteroid for Al Nagler, and its official designation is 10715 Nagler.

== See also ==
- Televue
