= Electronic eyepiece =

Space

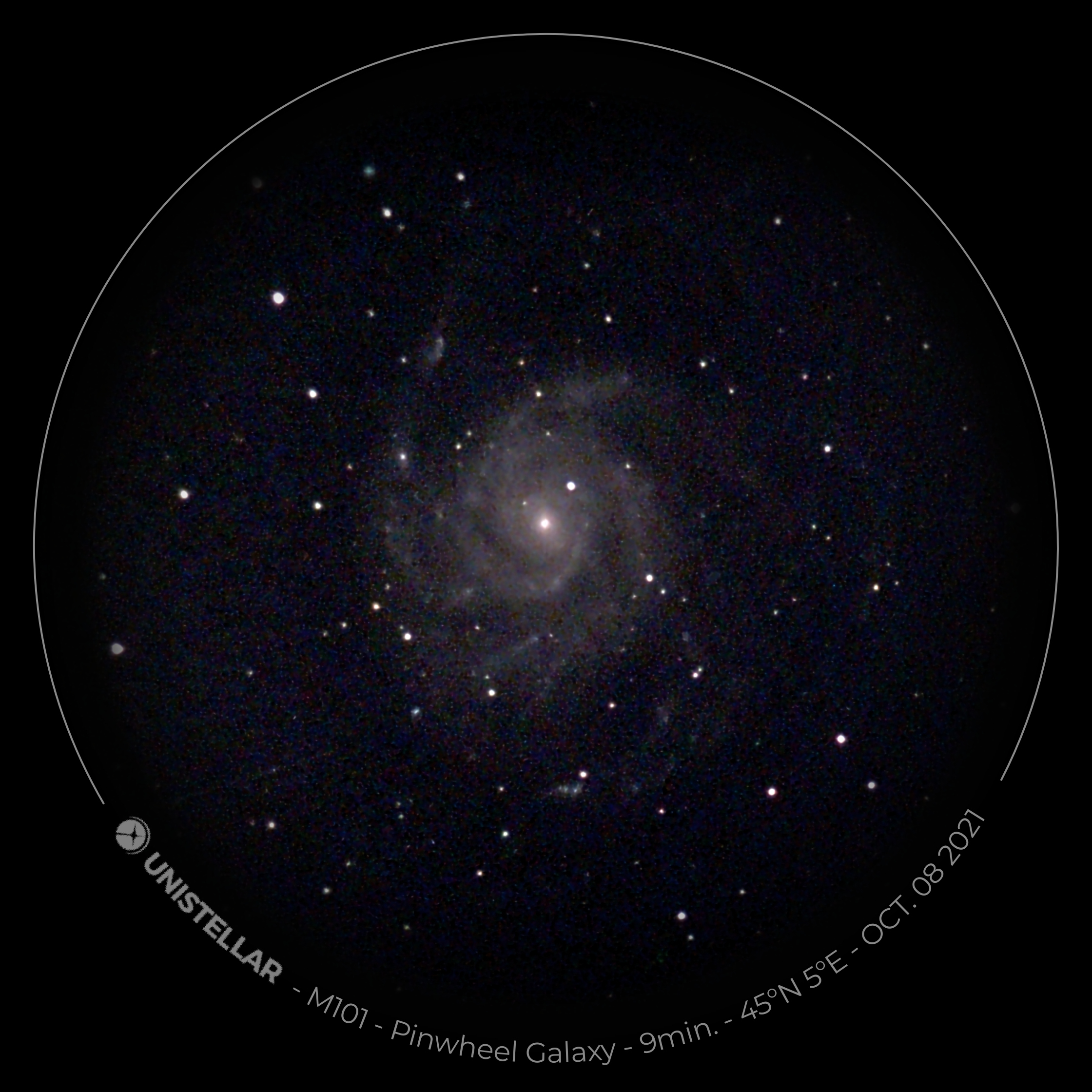
Pinwheel Galaxy as seen through a digital eyepiece

An electronic eyepiece is a type of eyepiece that incorporates digital technology—such as cameras or electronic enhancements—and may also feature built-in lighting.

Electronic eyepieces integrate a precision-engineered lens system with cutting-edge OLED micro-display technology to produce contrast and visual clarity. More specifically, they combine a refined lens arrangement with OLED micro-display projection to simulate infinite distance.

Some technologies involved are: Dynamic Signal Amplification, which enhances light signals from distant celestial bodies by rapidly stacking and processing short exposures in real-time, and Deep Dark Technology, which filters out light pollution automatically, ensuring urban environments don't interfere with your observations.

== See also ==
- Electronic viewfinder
- Video astronomy
