= Field lens =

In imaging optics, a field lens is a positive-powered lens or group of lenses that comes after the objective lens and before the image plane or the eyepiece, serving to change the size of the image or to provide image-space telecentricity. It is used for the reduction of detector size and, in instances needing high optical gain factor, it can correct aberrations through its several elements. Optical systems that feature multiple image planes are at risk of a potential problem, which involves the inability on the part of succeeding relay lenses to capture a cone of light from the primary objective lens. The field lens—by behaving as a variably angled lens—solves this problem by bending or refracting the cone of light back into the succeeding relay lens.

In X-ray microscopy, the field lens is used to produce parallel and homogeneous illumination of the stencil.
