= Peter Dollond =

English inventor (1731–1820)

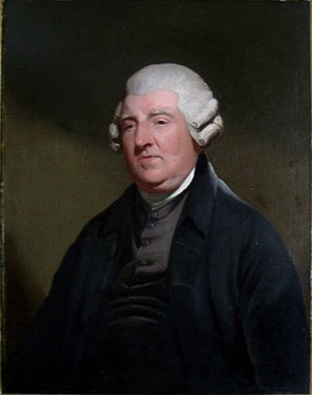
- Born: 2 February 1731; Kensington, London, England
- Died: 2 July 1820 (aged 89)
- Known for: Achromatic lens
- Scientific career
- Fields: Optics

Peter Dollond (2 February 1731 – 2 July 1820) was an English inventor of optical instruments. He was the son of optician John Dollond. He is known for his successful optics business, and for the invention of the apochromat.

== Biography ==
Dollond was born in Kensington. Working together with his father and subsequently with his younger brother and nephew (George Dollond) he successfully designed and manufactured a number of optical instruments. He is particularly credited with the invention of the triple achromatic lens - i.e., apochromatic lens - in 1763, still in wide use today, though known as the Cooke triplet after a much later 1893 patent.

Peter Dollond worked at first silk weaving with his father, but his father's passion for optics inspired him so much that in 1750 Peter quit the silk business and opened an optical instruments shop in Kennington, London. After two years, his father gave up silk, too, and joined him.

Dollond telescopes, for sidereal or terrestrial use, were amongst the most popular in both Great Britain and abroad for a period of over one and half centuries. Admiral Lord Nelson himself owned one. Another had sailed with Captain Cook in 1769 to observe the Transit of Venus. He was elected to the American Philosophical Society in 1772.

The Peter Dollond compound chest microscope is based on improvements to the Cuff-style microscope introduced by British scientific instrument designers Edward Nairne and Thomas Blunt around 1780. Another design was for the Peter Dollond compound monocular Eriometer around 1790 used to accurately measure the thickness and size of wool fibres.

After successfully defending a legal challenge to the patent he held for the achromatic lens the business prospered and he successfully sued his rivals for patent infringement. Dollond's reputation, especially with his father being a Fellow of the Royal Society as a result of his development and patenting of the achromat, provided the company with the de facto right of refusal on the best optical flint glass. This privilege permitted Dollond to maintain an edge in quality over competitor's telescopes and optical instruments for many years.

Notable customers also included:

- Leopold Mozart
- Frederick the Great
- Thomas Jefferson
- James Lind

Dollond & Co merged with Aitchison & Co in 1927 to form Dollond & Aitchison, the well-known British high street chain of opticians.

Peter Dollond's wife was Ann Phillips and they had two daughters, Louise and Anne.
