= Eye relief =

Optical instrument

The eye relief of an optical instrument (such as a telescope, a microscope, or binoculars) is the distance from the last surface of an eyepiece on the optical axis at which the user's eye can obtain the full viewing angle. If a viewer's eye is outside this distance, a reduced field of view will be obtained. The calculation of eye relief is complex, though generally, the higher the magnification and the larger the intended field of view, the shorter the eye relief.

== Eye relief and exit pupil ==
The eye relief property should not be confused with the exit pupil width of an instrument: that is best described as the width of the cone of light that is available to the viewer at the exact eye relief distance. An exit pupil larger than the observer's pupil wastes some light but allows for some fumbling in side-to-side movement without vignetting or clipping. Conversely, an exit pupil smaller than the eye's pupil will have all of its available light used, but since it cannot tolerate much side-to-side error in eye alignment, will often result in a vignetted or clipped image.

The exit pupil width of say, a binocular, can be calculated as the objective diameter divided by the magnification, and gives the width of the exit cone of light in the same dimensions as the objective. For example, a 10 × 42 binocular has a 4.2 mm wide exit cone, and fairly comfortable for general use, whereas doubling the magnification with a zoom feature to 20 × results in a much more critical 2.1 mm exit cone.

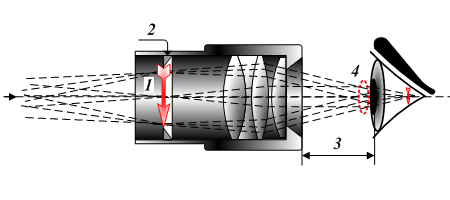
Optics showing eye relief and exit pupil 1 Real image 2 Field diaphragm 3 Eye relief 4 Exit pupil

Eye relief distance can be particularly important for eyeglass wearers and shooters. The eye of an eyeglass wearer is typically further from the eyepiece, so that user needs a longer eye relief in order to still see the entire field of view. A simple practical test as to whether or not spectacles limit the field of view can be conducted by viewing first without spectacles and then again with them. Ideally there should be no difference in the field.

For a shooter, eye relief is also a safety consideration. If the eye relief of a telescopic sight is too short, leaving the eye close to the sight, the firearm's recoil can force the optic's eyepiece to hit and cut into the skin around the shooter's eye, leaving a curved scarring laceration on the medial end of the supraorbital ridge and the eyebrow. This is frequently called a "scope bite", or the "idiot cut", due to the obvious and long-lasting nature of such a mistake. Typical eye relief distances for telescopic sights are often between one and four inches (25 to 100 mm), as opposed to the much shorter 15 to 17 mm for typical binoculars. The exit pupil widths in rifle sights are designed to be larger than the eye's pupil, to allow for a range of motion without vignetting.

== Available eye relief ==
The eye relief given in product specifications does not always give a realistic view of what a user can expect. Although eye-cups can usually be folded down to allow the spectacle wearer to get closer to binocular eyepieces, there are sometimes lens mountings that do not allow the theoretical eye relief to be obtained. A better measure for those with strict needs would be one that takes account of this available eye relief, the theoretical value less any thickness of the lens' rims. This point can account for confusion in performance and is rarely expressed clearly.

Additionally, when a spectacle wearer orders new glasses, the optician will ask them whether they prefer their spectacles close to the eyes or at some distance. This distance is referred to as the back vertex distance, or BVD on a prescription. Since this property affects the available eye relief of any binocular or other optics used, (telescopes, microscopes, etc.) it should be borne in mind at the eye testing stage. The matter should be discussed with the optician, though the only realistic way of testing the comfort is to try the optical device while wearing the usual spectacles. The optician can however make sure that the BVD is no worse in the new glasses than in the old ones that were used during evaluation.

== Adding prescription lenses ==
In the event that a spectacle wearer cannot obtain the eye relief that they require, some cameras and microscopes allow prescription lenses to be fitted onto their eyepieces. In this way, the user can temporarily dispense with glasses in favor of the lens mounted on the optics. Although this method does not afford good incidental vision for the field around them, it might still be of use to some.
