= Triplet lens =

Compound lens consisting of three single lenses

A triplet lens is a compound lens consisting of three single lenses. The triplet design is the simplest to give the required number of degrees of freedom to allow the lens designer to overcome all Seidel aberrations.

A triplet lens

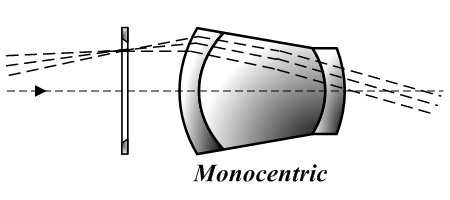
A Steinheil triplet telescope eyepiece

The three lenses may be cemented together, as in the Steinheil triplet (optimized for finite conjugate ratio) or the Hastings triplet (optimized for infinite conjugate ratio). Or a triplet may be designed with three spaced glasses, as in the Cooke triplet. The former has the advantage of higher optical throughput due to fewer air-glass interfaces, but the latter provides greater flexibility in aberration control, as the internal surfaces are not confined to have the same radii of curvature.

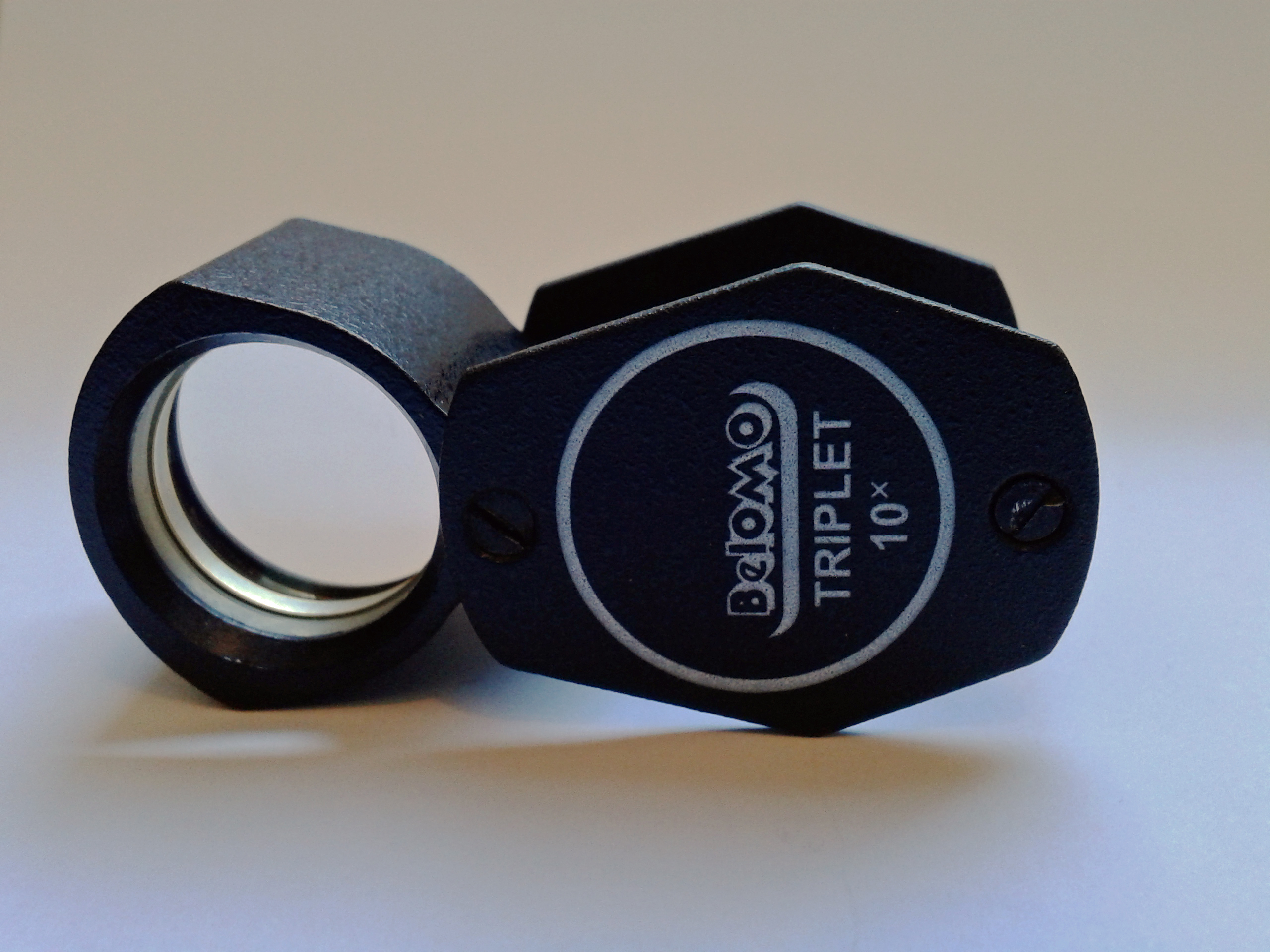
BelOMO 10× achromatic triplet jewellers' loupe

Jewellers' loupes typically use a triplet lens.

== See also ==
- Doublet (lens)
- Achromatic lens
- Apochromatic lens
- The five Seidel aberrations
- Mangin mirror
