= Doublet (lens) =

Type of optical lens

An achromatic doublet

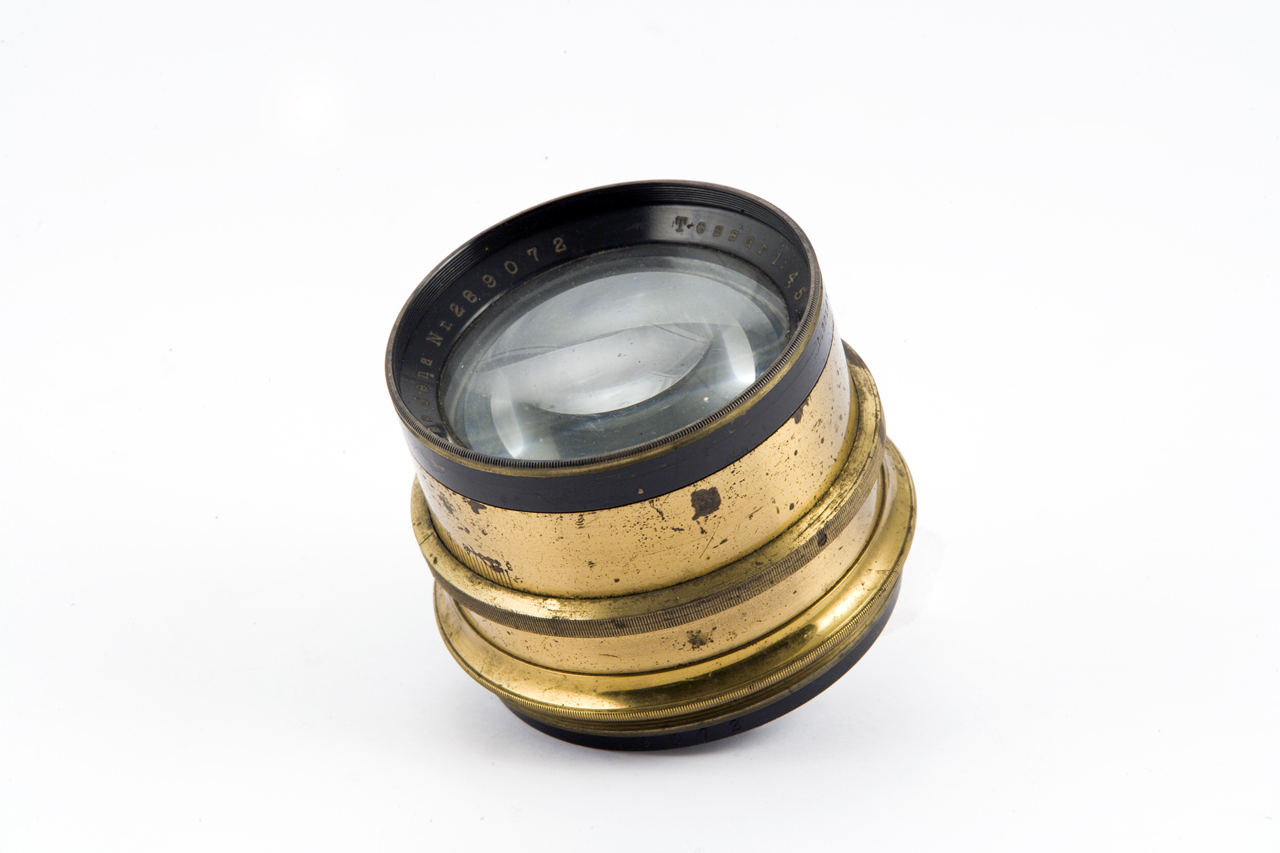
An old Carl Zeiss Tessar camera lens with four elements, comprising two doublets. The front doublet is air-gapped and divergent; the rear doublet is glued and convergent. This arrangement was better at correcting spherical and chromatic aberrations and astigmatism than previous lens designs.

In optics, a doublet is a type of lens made up of two simple lenses paired together. Such an arrangement allows more optical surfaces, thicknesses, and formulations, especially as the space between lenses may be considered an "element". With additional degrees of freedom, optical designers have more latitude to correct more optical aberrations more thoroughly.

== Types ==
Doublets can come in many forms, though most commercial doublets are achromats, which are optimized to reduce chromatic aberration while also reducing spherical aberration and other optical aberrations. The lenses are made from glasses with different refractive indices and different amounts of dispersion. Often one element is a positive lens made of crown glass and the other is a negative lens made of flint glass. This combination produces a better image than a simple lens. Some Trilobites, which are now extinct, had natural doublet lenses in their eyes. Apochromats can also be made as doublets.

Doublets can be air-spaced, cemented, or "oiled". Oiled doublets hold the optical fluid in place with surface tension alone. Elements may be cemented by oil or a soft cement in the case when the differential thermal expansion of crown and flint glasses causes hard or cured cements to warp or fracture. With larger elements, it is ideal to separate the lenses using a spacer. In a hard-cemented doublet, the lenses are held together by an adhesive with mechanical strength, such as optically transparent epoxy. Canada balsam was traditionally used for this purpose. Some doublets use no adhesive between the lenses, relying on external fixturing to hold them together, either because the optical design requires a gap or because thermal expansion differences between the two lenses will not allow cementing. These are called "un-cemented", "air-spaced" or "broken contact" doublets. A sub-type of air-spaced doublet is the dialyte, a design where elements are widely spaced to save on the amount of glass used or where the elements cannot be cemented because they have strongly dissimilar curvatures.

== Cement ==
Lenses may be cemented together for any of several reasons:

1. To eliminate the reflection losses of two air-glass surface interfaces.
2. To prevent total reflection at the air-film interface due to critical ray angle.
3. To replace a low-power lens that is difficult to mount with an equivalent doublet made from two higher-power lenses.

There are several advantages and disadvantages to cementing elements together:

=== Advantages ===
1. Cementing elements can simplify raytracing operations as the cement may nearly always be ignored, with the tracer treating the ray as if it refracts directly from one element into the next.
2. Cemented groups may assist to decrease the physical length of the optical system.
3. Provides superior control for minimising spherochromatism and other aberrations, allowing the creation of more advanced optical systems using fewer elements.

=== Disadvantages ===
1. Cementing elements requires a high precision to ensure correct centering of the cemented components. This difficulty greatly increases on groups of more than two elements.
2. Precision cementing is high in manufacturing cost. It is often cheaper to AR-coat two air-spaced elements.

== See also ==
- Achromatic lens
- Triplet lens
