= Simon Plössl =

Austrian optical instrument maker

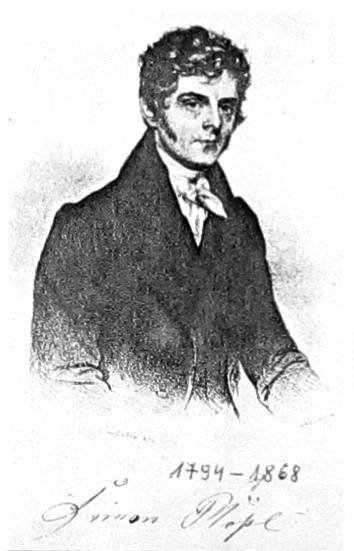
Simon Plössl

Simon Plössl (September 19, 1794, Vienna – January 29, 1868, Vienna) was an Austrian optical instrument maker. Initially trained at the Voigtländer company, he set up his own workshop in 1823. His major achievement at the time was the improvement of the achromatic microscope objective. Today he is best known for the eponymous Plössl telescope eyepiece, which follows his 1860 design and has been used extensively by amateur astronomers since the 1980s.
