= Carl Kellner (optician) =

German businessman (1826–1855)

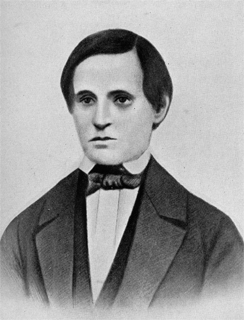
Carl Kellner

Carl Kellner (March 26, 1826 – May 13, 1855) was a German mechanic and self-educated mathematician who founded in 1849 an "Optical Institute" that later became the Leitz company, makers of the Leica cameras.

== Biography ==
Carl Kellner was born in Hirzenhain, Wetteraukreis, in Hesse. In 1849 he founded in Wetzlar a company called "Optisches Institut" for the production of lenses and microscopes. Kellner had invented a new achromatic combination of lenses for an eyepiece, published in his treatise Das orthoskopische Ocular, eine neu erfundene achromatische Linsencombination, that was able to produce an image with correct perspective and without the distortions that were usual for other optical instruments of the time. His invention is still useful and known as the Kellner eyepiece.

== Legacy ==
After his early death in Wetzlar in 1855 from tuberculosis at the age of 29, his widow led the company, which had twelve employees at that time. In 1856, she married her employee Friedrich Belthle (February 27, 1829 – May 9, 1869), who from then on managed the company. In 1864, precision mechanic Ernst Leitz I joined them; he became a partner on October 7, 1865, took over the company in 1869 and re-founded it as the Ernst Leitz GmbH. The company expanded quickly; its newly developed binocular microscope was a market success.

== See also ==
- Leica Camera
