= Charles S. Hastings =

American physicist

Charles Sheldon Hastings
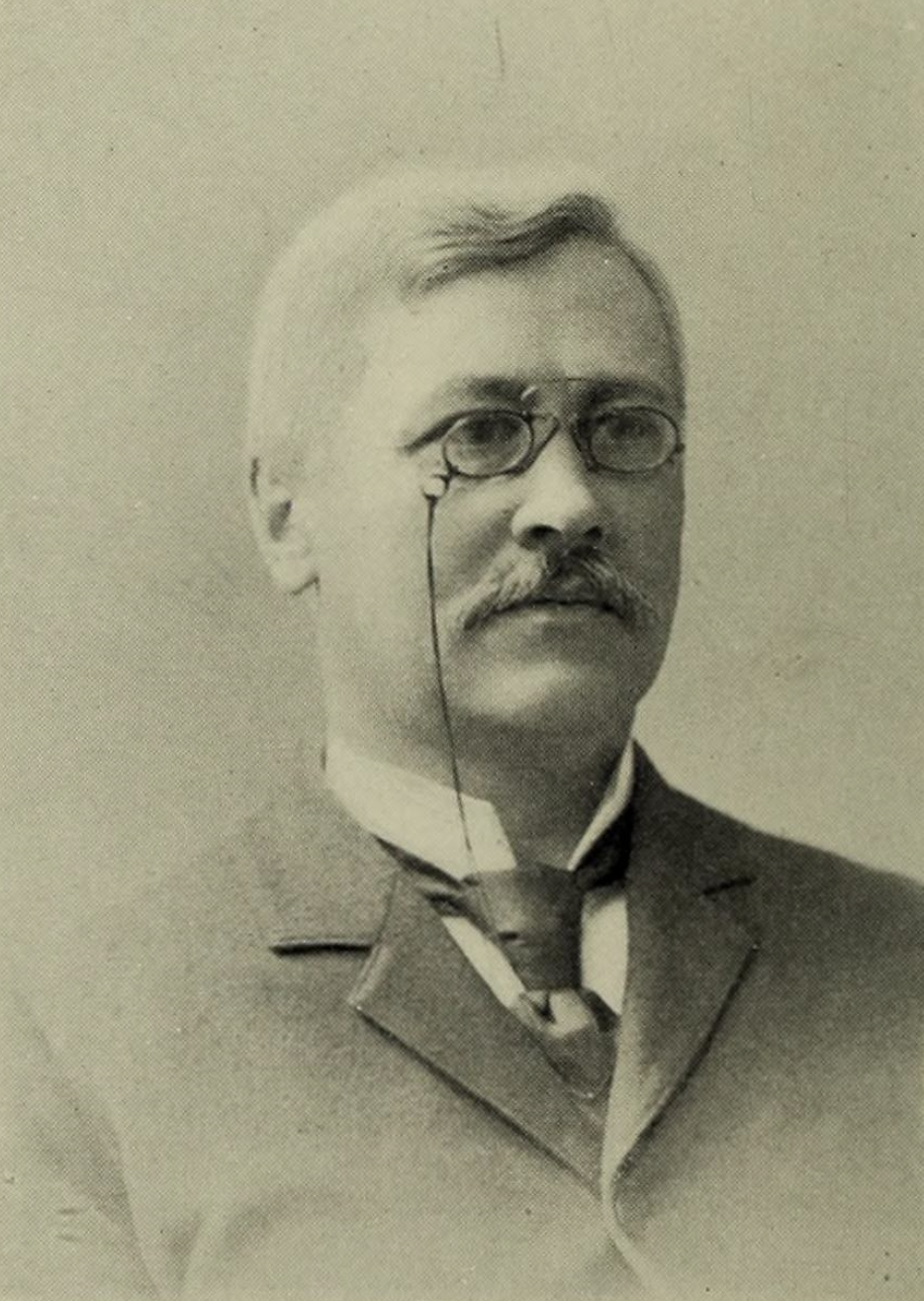
- Born: November 27, 1848; Clinton, New York
- Died: January 31, 1932 (aged 83); Greenwich, Connecticut
- Education: Yale University
- Known for: Geometrical optics
- Awards: Elliott Cresson Medal (1926)
- Scientific career
- Fields: Physics
- Workplaces: Sheffield Scientific School at Yale University, Johns Hopkins University

Charles Sheldon Hastings (November 27, 1848 – January 31, 1932) was an American physicist known for his work in optics. His father was Panet Marshall Hastings and his mother was Jane Sheldon Hastings. The father was a physician and anatomy teacher at Hamilton College, where Charles was born. At the age of six the family moved to Hartford, Connecticut, where Charles received his early education. Hastings entered Yale University's Sheffield School of Science in 1867 and received his bachelor's degree in 1870. His early interest in astronomy and telescopes were likely due to Chester Lyman, Chair of Physics and Astronomy at the Sheffield School. He then earned a PhD from Yale in 1873, and immediately was made an instructor in physics. In 1875 he resigned to study in Germany and France until being named an associate at the new Johns Hopkins University in 1876. He became an associate professor of physics at Johns Hopkins University and the first Chair of Professor of Physics of Sheffield Scientific School at Yale University. He collaborated with John A. Brashear on the optical design of large telescopes including the 72-inch (180 cm) reflector at Dominion Astrophysical Observatory and the 30-inch (76 cm) photographic refractor at Allegheny Observatory. His optical designs enabled much progress in astronomy at U.S. observatories. The Hastings Triplet magnifying glass design is based on his optical formulae. In 1916, he was elected an Honorary Member of the Optical Society of America. He was awarded the Elliott Cresson Medal in 1926.

In 1878 Hastings married Elizabeth Tracy Smith and they remained together for more than fifty years, until Elizabeth died in 1930 after a long illness. After the death of his wife, Hastings himself declined rapidly and died in January 1932. He was a member of the Connecticut Academy of Arts and Sciences, the American Philosophical Society, and the United States National Academy of Sciences. In 1898, Hastings co-authored, with Frederick E. Beach, a textbook entitled A Text-Book of General Physics, which has been characterized as "difficult." It was considered an excellent text for those already enamored with physics but a bad one for those not so enthusiastic about the subject. One copy of this book, apparently once owned by a less enthusiastic student, reportedly contains the inscribed verse, "If we should have another flood | For safety hither fly | Although the earth would be submerged | This book would still be dry."

== See also ==
- Triplet lens
