= Simple lens =

Simple optical device

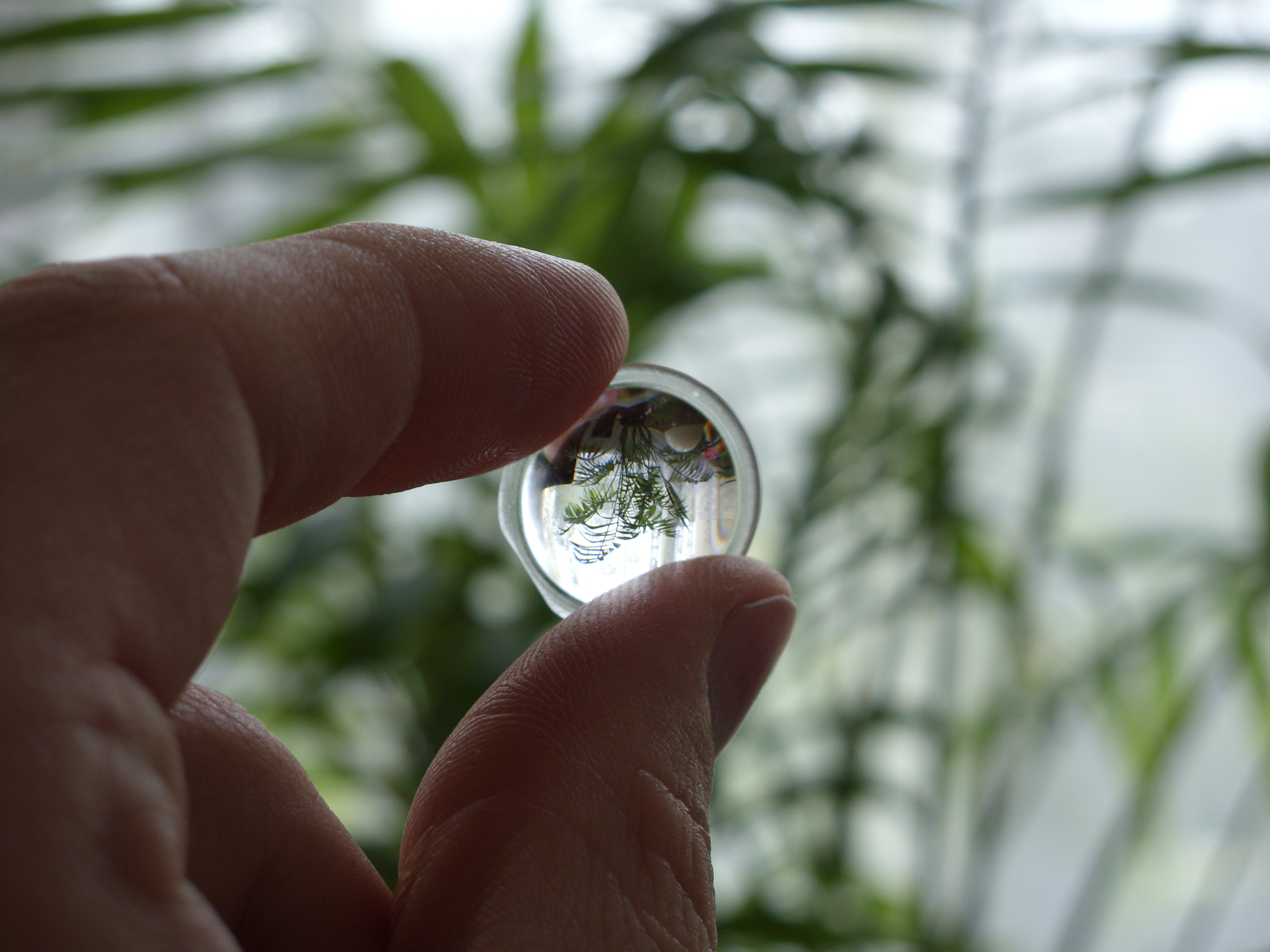
A convex lens flipping an image vertically

In optics, a simple lens or singlet lens is a lens consisting of a single simple element. Typical examples include a magnifying glass or a lens in a pair of simple reading glasses.

Simple lenses are prone to aberrations, especially chromatic aberration. They cannot be used for precise imaging and make poor camera lenses. They are commonly used for laser applications, however, where the beams are both monochromatic (minimizing chromatic aberration) and narrow (minimizing spherical aberration).

Some cameras with fixed lenses have been made using a simple lens, usually a meniscus lens with the convex face facing outward. In such examples the lens aperture is made small and in some cases (such as the Kodak Brownie 127 camera), the film plane is curved to reduce the impact of aberrations.

== See also ==
- Doublet (lens)
- Aspheric lens
