= Least distance of distinct vision =

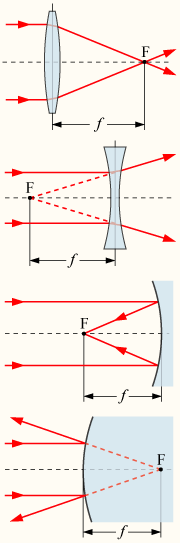
The focal point F and focal length f of a positive (convex) lens, a negative (concave) lens, a concave mirror, and a convex mirror.

In optometry, the least distance of distinct vision (LDDV) or the reference seeing distance (RSD) is the closest someone with "normal" vision (20/20 vision) can comfortably look at something. In other words, LDDV is the minimum comfortable distance between the naked human eye and a visible object.

The magnifying power (M) of a lens with focal length (f in millimeters) when viewed by the naked human eye can be calculated as:

$${M} = \frac{250}{f}.$$

== See also ==
- Optometry
- Far point
- Snellen chart
- Visual perception
- Visual impairment
