= Video astronomy =

Video astronomy (aka - Camera Assisted Astronomy, aka electronically-assisted astronomy or "EAA") is a branch of astronomy for near real-time observing of relatively faint astronomical objects using very sensitive CCD or CMOS cameras. Unlike lucky imaging, video astronomy does not discard unwanted frames, and image corrections such as dark subtraction are often not applied, however, the gathered data may be retained and processed in more traditional ways.. Although the field has a long history reaching back to 1928 with the inception of live television broadcasting of the planet Mars, it has largely been developed more recently by amateur enthusiasts and is characterized by the use of relatively inexpensive equipment, such as easily available sensitive security cameras, in contrast to the equipment used for advanced astrophotography.

By using either method of rapid internally stacked images, or very short exposure times, and using a TV monitor (for analog cameras) or a computer with readily available software (for USB cameras), video astronomy allows observers to see colour and detail that would not register to the eye. Because the image can be displayed on a monitor or television screen it allows multiple people to share 'live' images; using the internet it is possible for a worldwide audience to share such images. Live broadcasting websites exist for sharing live video astronomy feeds.

Video astronomy, combined with remote control of a telescope, allows anyone including disabled people to operate a telescope remotely, or observers in a light-polluted area to operate a telescope in another area, even another country.

Other benefits of the highly sensitive cameras used in video astronomy are the ability to see through thin cloud, and the ability to see many faint objects in areas suffering from light pollution. The equipment used varies from webcams and basic security cameras to specialized video astronomy cameras. Recent growing interest in the video 'near-live' aspect of astronomy has brought about websites devoted purely to the practice and forums for users of the equipment
