= List of astronomical instrument makers =

The following is a list of astronomical instrument makers, along with lifespan and country of work, if available.

== A ==
Name	Lifespan	Country of work
Abiyun al-Bitriq	fl. 630	
Jabir ibn Aflah (Geber)	c. 1100–1150	Islamic Spain
Allahdad Asturlabi Humayani Lahuri	fl. 1567–70	Mughal Empire

== B ==
Name	Lifespan	Country of work
James Gilbert Baker	1914–2005	US
George Bass	early 18th century	England
Bhāskara II	c. 1114–1185	India
John Bird	18th century	England
Abū Rayhān al-Bīrūnī	973–1048	Persia
Tycho Brahe	1546–1601	Denmark
John Brashear	1840–1920	US

== C ==
Name	Lifespan	Country of work
Giuseppe Campani	1635–1715	Italy
Matteo Campani-Alimenis	17th century	Italy
Robert-Aglaé Cauchoix	1776–1845	France
Henri Chrétien	1879–1956	France
Alvan Clark	1804–1887	US
Alvan Graham Clark	1832–1897	US
George Bassett Clark	1827–1891	US
Thomas Cooke	1807–1868	England
Robert E. Cox	1917–1989	US

== D ==
Name	Lifespan	Country of work
John Henry Dallmeyer	1830–1883	England / Germany
Diya al-Din Muhammad	fl. 1654–1681	Mughal Empire
John Dobson	1915–2014	US
John Dollond	1706–1761	England
Henry Draper	1837–1882	US

== E ==
Name	Lifespan	Country of work

== F ==
Name	Lifespan	Country of work
Henry Fitz	1808–1863	US
Joseph von Fraunhofer	1787–1826	Germany

== G ==
Name	Lifespan	Country of work
Vilem Gajdusek	1895–1977	Czech Republic
Galileo Galilei	1564–1642	Italy
James Gregory	1638–1675	Scotland
Howard Grubb	1844–1931	Ireland

== H ==
Name	Lifespan	Country of work
George Ellery Hale	1868–1938	US
Hamid ibn Muhammad Muqim	fl. 1628–91	Mughal Empire
Frederick James Hargreaves	1891–1970	England
Caroline Herschel	1750–1848	England
William Herschel	1738–1822	England
Henry Hindley	1701–1771	England
Robert Hooke	1635–1703	England
Christiaan Huygens	1629–1695	Netherlands

== I ==
Name	Lifespan	Country of work
Albert Graham Ingalls	1888–1958	US
Isa ibn Allahdad	fl. 1601–1605	Mughal Empire
Zenbei Iwahashi	1756–1811	Japan

== J ==
Name	Lifespan	Country of work
Jamal al-Din ibn Muhammad Muqim	fl. 1666–91	Mughal Empire
Zacharias Janssen	c. 1580–c. 1638	Netherlands

== K ==
Name	Lifespan	Country of work
Jamshīd al-Kāshī	c. 1380–1429	Persia
Al-Khazini	fl. 1115–1130	Persia
Abu-Mahmud al-Khujandi	c. 940–1000	Persia
Muhammad ibn Mūsā al-Khwārizmī (Algoritmi)	780–850	Iraq
Gottfried Kirch	1639–1710	Germany

== L ==
Name	Lifespan	Country of work
Lala Balhumal Lahori	c. 1842	India
Hans Lippershey	1570–1619	Netherlands
Ali Kashmiri ibn Luqman	fl. 1589–1590	Mughal India

== M ==
Name	Lifespan	Country of work
Dmitri Maksutov	1896–1964	Russia / Soviet Union
Jacob Metius	c. 1575–1628	Netherlands
Muhammad Muqim	fl. 1609–59	Mughal Empire

== N ==
Name	Lifespan	Country of work
Isaac Newton	1643–1727	Kingdom of England/ Kingdom of Great Britain

== O ==
Name	Lifespan	Country of work

== P ==
Name	Lifespan	Country of work
William Parsons, 3rd Earl of Rosse	1800–1867	Ireland
Francis G. Pease	1881–1938	US
Richard Scott Perkin	1906–1969	US
John M. Pierce	1886–1958	US
Russell W. Porter	1871–1949	US

== Q ==
Name	Lifespan	Country of work
Qaim Muhammad	fl. 1609–38	Mughal Empire

== R ==
Name	Lifespan	Country of work
Regiomontanus	1436–1476	Germany / Italy / Hungary
Georg Friedrich von Reichenbach	1772–1826	Germany
George Willis Ritchey	1864–1945	US

== S ==
Name	Lifespan	Country of work
George N. Saegmuller	1847–1934	US
Bernhard Schmidt	1879–1935	Germany
Ibn al-Shatir	1304–1375	Syria
James Short	1710–1768	Kingdom of Great Britain
James Simms	1828–1915	England
William Simms	1793–1860	England
Abd al-Rahman al-Sufi (Azophi)	903–986	Persia

== T ==
Name	Lifespan	Country of work
Muhammad Saleh Thattvi	fl. 1659–1660	Mughal India
Taqi al-Din Muhammad ibn Ma'ruf	1526–1585	Syria / Egypt / Turkey
Edward Troughton	1753–1835	England
Sharaf al-Dīn al-Tūsī	1135–1213	Iraq

== U ==
Name	Lifespan	Country of work

== V ==
Name	Lifespan	Country of work
Cornelius Varley	1781–1873	England
Yrjö Väisälä	1891–1971	Finland

== W ==
Name	Lifespan	Country of work
James Watt	1736–1819	Scotland

== X ==
Name	Lifespan	Country of work

== Y ==
Name	Lifespan	Country of work
Ibn Yunus	c. 950–1009	Egypt

== Z ==
Name	Lifespan	Country of work
Abraham Zacuto	c. 1450–1510	Spain and Portugal
Abū Ishāq Ibrāhīm al-Zarqālī (Arzachel)	1028–1087	Islamic Spain

== See also ==
- History of the telescope
- List of largest optical reflecting telescopes
- List of largest optical refracting telescopes
- List of observatory codes
- List of Russian astronomers and astrophysicists
- List of telescope types
- Space telescope
- Timeline of telescopes, observatories, and observing technology
