= George Bassett Clark =

American astronomer and instrument maker

George Bassett
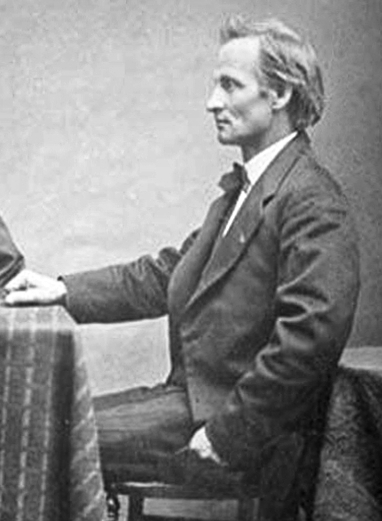
- Born: February 14, 1827; Lowell, Massachusetts, U.S.
- Died: December 20, 1891 (aged 64)

George Bassett Clark (February 14, 1827 – December 20, 1891) was an American instrument maker and astronomer.

Born in Lowell, Massachusetts and educated at Phillips Academy, Andover, he was the son of Alvan Clark, part of a family of refracting telescope makers. In 1846, George Bassett Clark joined his father and brother Alvan Graham Clark at the family's telescope works in Cambridge, Massachusetts. The firm, Alvan Clark & Sons, made many of the record-breaking refracting instruments, including the still-largest refracting telescope at the Yerkes Observatory, gaining "worldwide fame and distribution", wrote one author on astronomy in 1899. Clark was elected a Fellow of the American Academy of Arts and Sciences in 1878.

== See also ==
- List of astronomical instrument makers
