= Alvan Clark =

American astronomer and telescope maker

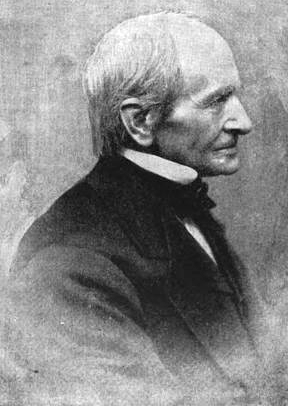
- Born: March 8, 1804; Ashfield, Massachusetts
- Died: August 19, 1887 (aged 83)
- Awards: Rumford Prize (1866)
- Scientific career
- Fields: Astronomy

Alvan Clark (March 8, 1804 – August 19, 1887) was an American astronomer and telescope maker.

== Biography ==
Born in Ashfield, Massachusetts, Clark started as a portrait painter and engraver (c.1830s–1850s), and at the age of 40 became involved in telescope making. Using glass blanks made by Chance Brothers of Birmingham, England, and Feil-Mantois of Paris, France, his firm Alvan Clark & Sons ground lenses for refracting telescopes. Their lenses included the largest in the world at the time: the 18.5-inch (47 cm) at Dearborn Observatory at the Old University of Chicago (the lens originally intended for Ole Miss); also the two 26-inch (66 cm) telescopes at the United States Naval Observatory and McCormick Observatory, the 30-inch (76 cm) at Pulkovo Observatory, which was destroyed in the Siege of Leningrad (only the lens survives), the 36-inch (91 cm) telescope at Lick Observatory (still the third-largest), and later the 40-inch (100 cm) at Yerkes Observatory, which remains the largest successful refracting telescope in the world.

Although not specifically searching for double stars, he did make a number of discoveries while testing his completed telescope objectives, including Mu Herculis, 8 Sextantis, and 95 Ceti. One of Clark's sons, Alvan Graham Clark, discovered the dim companion of Sirius. Two craters bear Clark Sr.'s name. The crater Clark on the Moon is jointly named for him and his son, Alvan Graham Clark, and one on Mars is named in his honour. His other son was George Bassett Clark; both sons were partners in the firm.

Clark was also competitive in target shooting and received a patent for his device to allow bullets to be seated into a muzzle-loading rifle without damage to either the bullet or the rifle's muzzle. Exclusive license to this patent (1,565 of April 24, 1840) was made to Edwin Wesson, brother of Daniel B. Wesson.

In 1880, Clark was elected as a member to the American Philosophical Society.

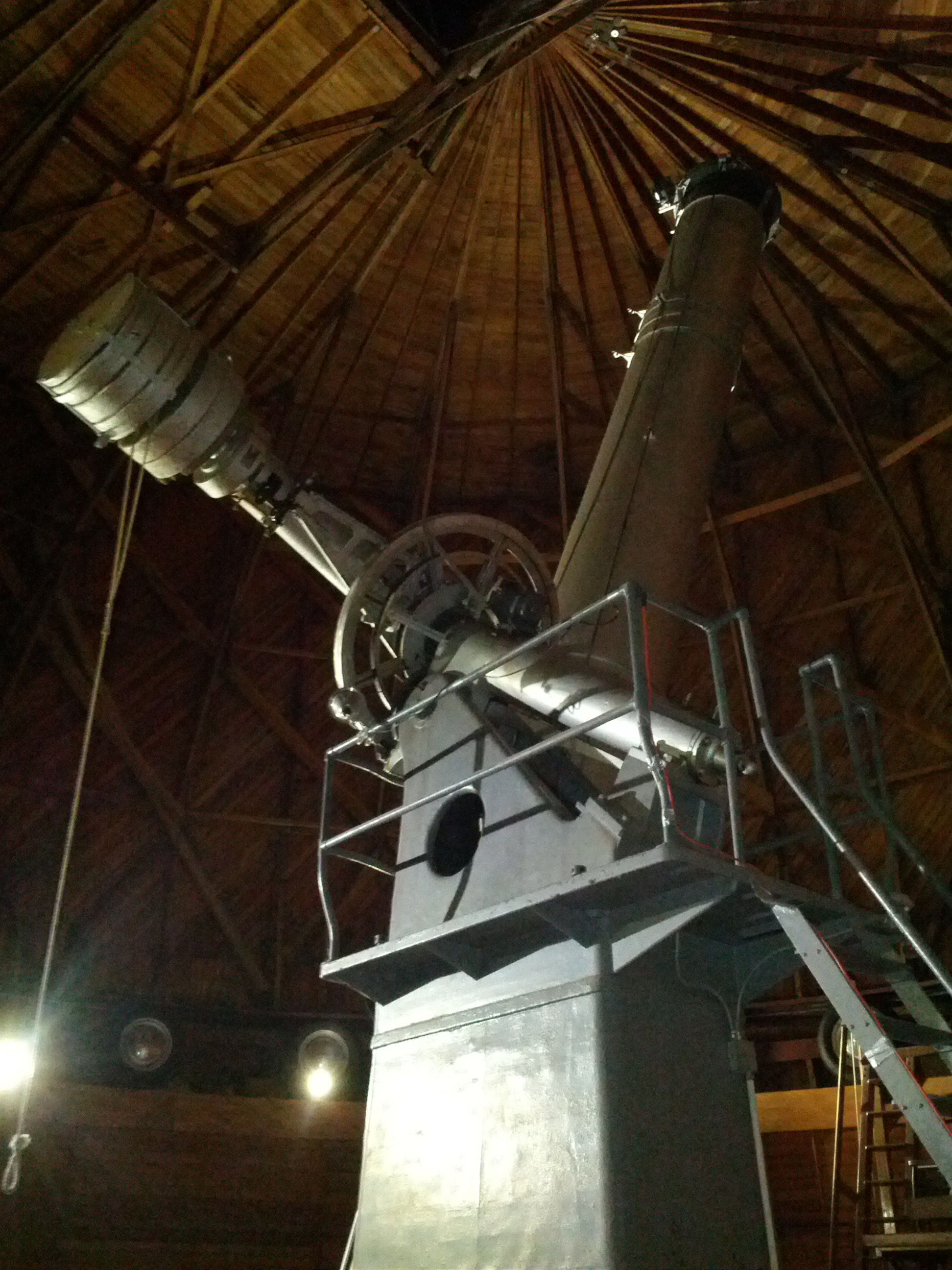
Alvan Clark Refractor Telescope at Lowell Observatory

== See also ==
- List of astronomical instrument makers
- List of largest optical refracting telescopes

== Image gallery ==
Portraits by Clark

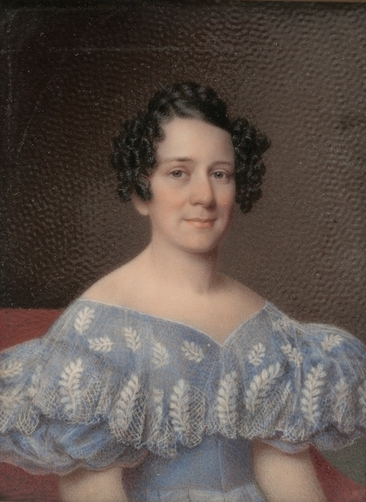
Portrait of an unidentified woman, c. 1835 (Metropolitan Museum of Art, New York City)

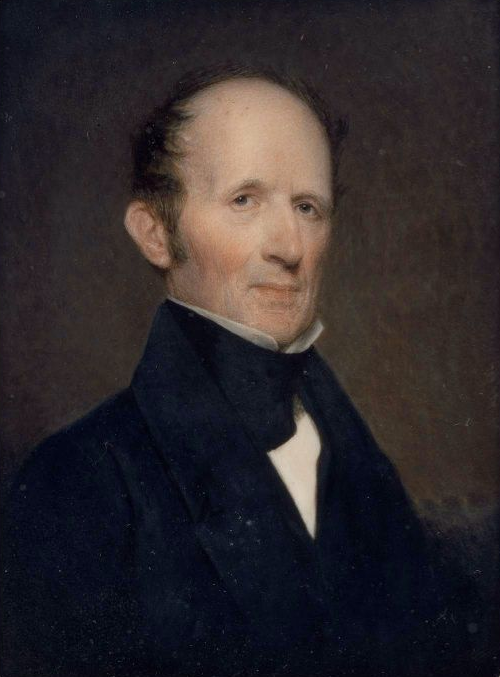
Portrait of John Pickering, c. 1840 (Museum of Fine Arts, Boston)

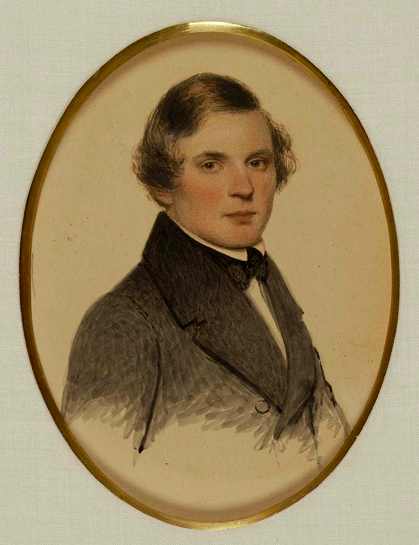
Portrait of Samuel Hall Gregory, c. 1840s (Smithsonian, Washington D.C.)

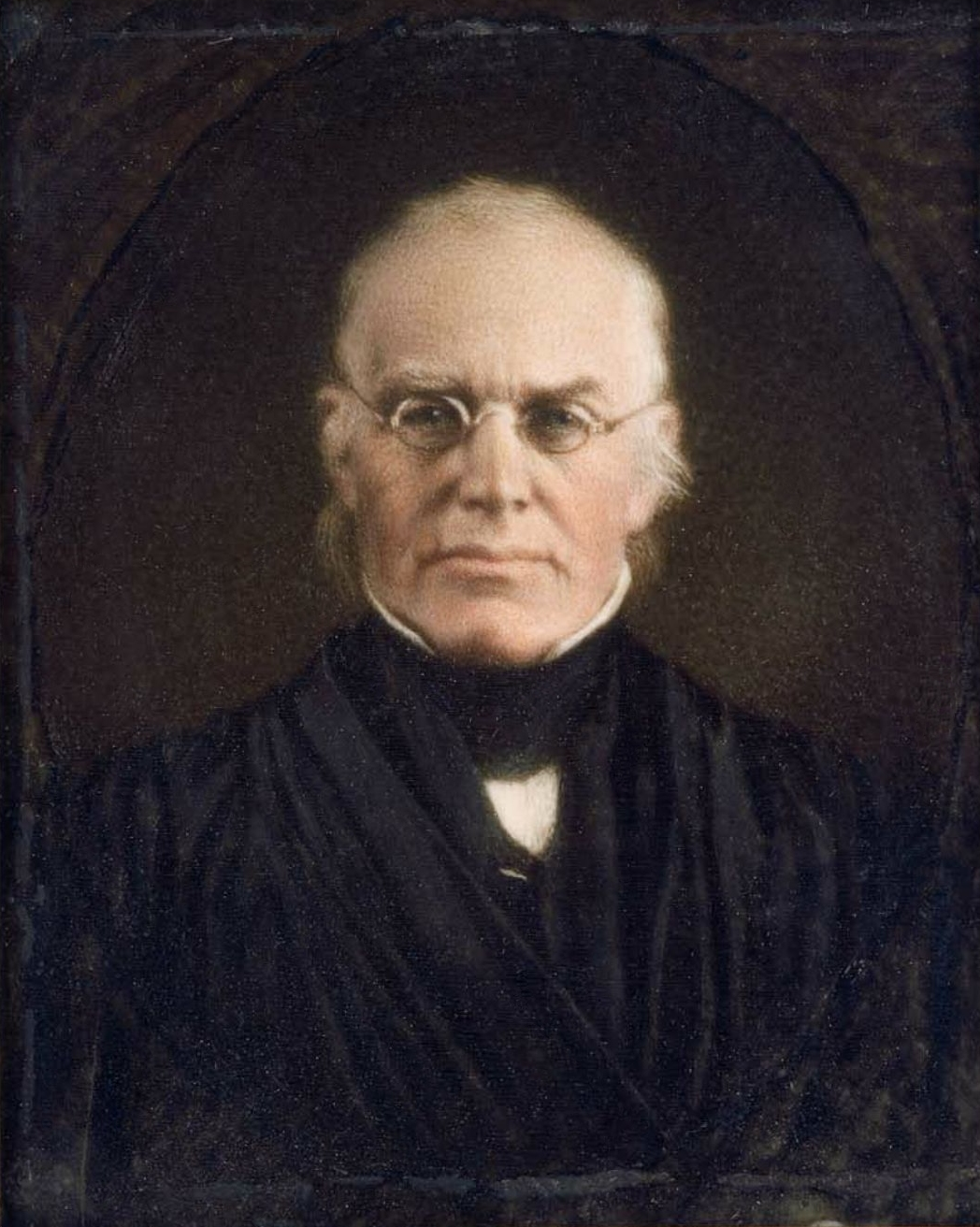
Portrait of Joseph Story, 1846 (Museum of Fine Arts, Boston)
