= Gajdusek =

Gajdusek is a surname. Notable people with the surname include:

- Miroslav Gajdůšek (born 1951), Czech footballer
- Daniel Carleton Gajdusek (1923–2008), American physician and medical researcher
- Vilém Gajdušek (1895–1977), Czech optician and telescope designer

== See also ==
- 3603 Gajdušek
