= Seneca Foods =

American fruit and vegetable processor

Seneca Foods Corporation
- Type: Public
- Traded as: Nasdaq: SENEA (Class A); Nasdaq: SENEB (Class B); Russell 2000 Component (SENEA)
- Industry: Canned foods, snacks, air charter
- Founded: 1949; 77 years ago
- Headquarters: Fairport, New York, USA
- Key people: Paul L. Palmby (president and CEO)
- Products: Canned and frozen fruits and vegetables, snacks
- Revenue: ▲$1,245,681,000 US (2017)
- Operating income: ▲$29,121,000 US (2017)
- Net income: ▲$12,613,000 US (2017)
- Number of employees: 3,200 full-time, 9,700 seasonal (2009)
- Website: senecafoods.com

Seneca Foods Corporation is an American food processor and distributor headquartered in Fairport, New York, United States. Seneca Foods Corporation conducts its business almost entirely in food packaging, which contributed to about 98% of the company's fiscal year net sales in 2017. Canned vegetables represented 65%, fruit products represented 23%, frozen fruit and vegetables represented 11% and fruit chip products represented 1% of the total food packaging net sales. Non-food packaging sales, which were primarily related to the sale of cans and ends, and outside revenue from the company's trucking and aircraft operations, represented 2% of the fiscal year 2017 net sales. Approximately 12% of the company's packaged foods were sold under its own brands, or licensed trademarks, including Seneca, Libby's, Aunt Nellie's, CherryMan, Green Valley, Read, and Seneca Farms. About 52% of the packaged foods were sold under private labels and 26% was sold to institutional food distributors. The remaining 10% was sold under a contract packing agreement with B&G Foods North America under the Green Giant label.

== History ==
The company was founded in 1949 in Dundee, New York, by Cornell University business student Arthur S. Wolcott. In the 1950s, Seneca contracted with Minute Maid to co-pack the first frozen grape juice in the nation. Apple processing, specialty syrups and maraschino cherries were added to the product line. The development of private label, bulk, industrial and co–pack segments also took place during this time. Fruit processing remained the primary focus for the next several decades.

During the 1960s, the company expanded with new plants and products, including the nation's first frozen apple juice concentrate, under the Seneca brand. The corporate name was changed from Seneca Grape Juice Company to Seneca Foods Corporation. During this time, the Prosser, Washington, plant was opened for the production of applesauce and fruit juices, and the company added brokers and expanded distribution. Seneca stock began trading in the over-the-counter market, and apple juice enriched with vitamin C was introduced – a first in the industry.

The company grew in the 1970s through acquisitions of companies in the food distribution, canned vegetable, glass, paint and textile businesses. Through one of these acquisitions, Julius G. Kayser joined Seneca and played a key role in the company's growth until his death in 1988. The corporate name was changed to S.S. Pierce Company, and production of metal cans began.

During the 1980s, the corporate name changed back to Seneca Foods Corporation, and the company consolidated most of its non-food operations and focused on its fruit and vegetable lines. The company produced the first natural frozen grape juice and expanded the juice line into white grape, cranberry and cranberry blends. The company entered the private label retail and food service vegetable business in the Midwest and began producing IQF frozen vegetables for the food service and industrial markets.

In the 1990s, through further acquisitions and internal growth, Seneca became the world's largest processor of canned vegetables. The company acquired six plants from Pillsbury and entered into an alliance with them to manufacture products under the Green Giant label. On September 20, 1995, the company went public. At the end of the decade, the company sold its juice and applesauce operations and raised capital with a shareholder rights offering. It expanded to global markets and purchased an apple chip business. Seneca operates some of the largest, most technologically advanced plants in the world, including the world's largest corn processing plant located in Glencoe, MN. Seneca Flight Operations also became the fixed-base operator at the Penn Yan, New York, Airport, and a hangar complex was constructed.

== Acquisitions ==
=== 1950s ===
- Hudson Valley Pure Food Co.
- Hilton Fruit Co-op
- North Wayne Co-op
- Westfield Maid Co-op

=== 1960s ===
- Boordy Vineyards

=== 1970s ===
- Lehman Bros.
- Castle Hansen
- S.S. Pierce Company and subsidiaries
- Marion Canning
- Fruit Belt Preserving Co.
- Seneca Kraut
- Perfection Foods

=== 1980s ===
- Libby's canned vegetable business
- Stokely vegetables from Quaker Oats Company

=== 1990s ===
- TreeSweet, Orange Plus, and Awake juice brands
- Blue Boy, Aunt Nellie's, and Lohmann vegetable brands
- Liberty Fruit Company 1997 (now closed)

=== 2000s ===
- Chiquita Processed Foods
- Signature Fruit Company

=== 2010s ===
- Paradise Fruit

=== 2020s ===
- Green Giant U.S. Shelf-Stable Products from B&G Foods
- Green Giant U.S. Frozen Products from B&G Foods

== Corporate governance ==
Current members of the board of directors of Seneca are Kraig H. Kayser, Arthur H. Baer, Andrew M. Boas, Robert T. Brady, Douglas F. Brush, G. Brymer Humphreys, Thomas Paulson, and Susan W. Stuart.
