= George W. Hough =

American astronomer

George Washington Hough
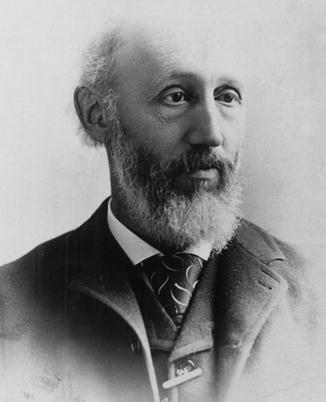
- Born: October 24, 1836; Tribes Hill, New York
- Died: January 1, 1909 (aged 72); Evanston, Illinois

George Washington Hough (October 24, 1836 – January 1, 1909) was an American astronomer.

== Biography ==
George Washington Hough was born in Tribes Hill, New York on October 24, 1836. He earned his BA at Union College in New York in 1856, and for a time served as a school principal in Dubuque, Iowa and as an assistant astronomer at the Cincinnati Observatory.

From 1862 to 1874, Hough was director of Dudley Observatory, Albany, New York. In 1879 he was appointed professor of astronomy at the University of Chicago. He became the director of Dearborn Observatory when the observatory was moved to Evanston, Illinois. He introduced original plans for the dome and electric control for the telescope. He discovered 627 double stars and made systematic studies of the surface of Jupiter. He designed and constructed several instruments used in astronomy, meteorology, and physics.

He was elected to the American Philosophical Society in 1872.

He died at his home in Evanston on January 1, 1909.
