= William Simms (instrument maker) =

- Born: 7 December 1793; Birmingham, England
- Died: 21 June 1860 (aged 66); Carshalton, Surrey, England
- Occupation: Scientific instrument maker
- Spouses: Ann Nutting (m. 1798–1839) Emma Hennell (m. 1811–1888)
- Children: Nine children by Ann Nutting and three by Emma Hennell
- Parent(s): William and Sarah Simms

William Simms (7 December 1793 – 21 June 1860) was a British scientific instrument maker.

== Early life ==
Simms was born in Birmingham, the second of nine children of William Simms, Sr. (1763-1828), a toy maker. Soon after young Simms's birth the family moved to London so that his father could help his ailing father, James Simms, who had a jewellery business in Whitecross Street. This concern was soon converted to the manufacture of optical instruments. William Sr., prospered and in 1804 he was elected a Freeman of the City.

Simms was sent in January 1806 to be educated in mathematics by a Mr. Hayward. After two years study he was apprenticed in January 1808 to Thomas Penstone, a member of the Worshipful Company of Goldsmiths. However Simms's interests lay elsewhere, and in 1808 he was re-apprenticed to his father.

== Career ==
Simms was elected a Freeman of the Worshipful Company of Goldsmiths in 1815, and set up in business for himself, working until 1818 at his father's Blackfriars premises. His elder brother James was already establishing his own reputation for navigational instruments.

Simms' chief interest was the division of the circle, the accuracy of which was essential to the manufacture of accurate scientific instruments. He became a correspondent of Thomas Jones, who brought him into contact with the instrument maker Edward Troughton and also persuaded him to join the Royal Society for the encouragement of Arts, Manufactures & Commerce. Here he met the engineer Bryan Donkin, and also Colonel Colby of the Ordnance Survey.

In the 1825 Simms was asked to repair and redivide an astronomical circle made by Troughton in 1800. Simms made and replaced parts where required, then redivided the circle. Later Simms wrote a paper for Troughton proposing a new method for dividing circles that was more accurate than an engine and quicker than using a roller. Edward Troughton took on William Simms as a partner in 1826 On Troughton's retirement Simms took over his business, which had a very good reputation in the manufacture of scientific instruments.

Simms specialized in surveying instruments and from 1817 supplied theodolites to the Ordnance Survey and then to the East India Company, including those used by George Everest. On a larger scale he supplied telescopes, mural circles and other astronomical instruments to observatories at Kraków, Madras, Cambridge, Lucknow, Calcutta, Edinburgh, Brussels, Greenwich and other places. By the close of his career he had supplied most of the world's leading observatories with equipment.

Simms' work formed the basis of the treatise on mathematical instruments written by his younger brother Frederick Walter Simms, who went on to become an important writer on civil engineering.

His reputation was enhanced by the improvements he made to graduating instruments and his self-acting circular dividing engine reduced the work involved in manufacture from weeks to hours. He also helped standardize the measures of length the yard and chain for the Admiralty.

Simms was elected an Associate of the Institution of Civil Engineers in 1828. He was a Fellow of the Royal Astronomical Society, which he joined in 1831, and elected a Fellow of the Royal Society in 1852.

Simms died at the family home in Carshalton on 21 June 1860 and was buried at West Norwood Cemetery. His family, most especially his son James Simms carried on his instrument making work.

== Honours ==
Simms Rock in Antarctica is named after William Simms.

== See also ==
- List of astronomical instrument makers
