= S. S. Pierce =

American grocer (1807–1880)

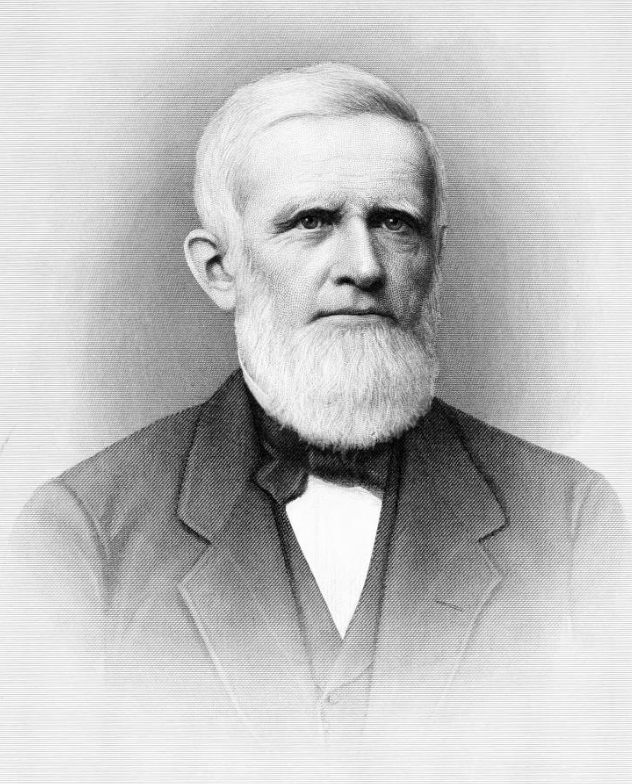
- Born: Samuel Stillman Pierce; March 27, 1807; Dorchester, Boston, Massachusetts, US
- Died: October 12, 1880 (aged 73); Boston, Massachusetts, US
- Occupation: Grocer
- Spouse: Ellen Maria Wallis (m. 1836)
- Children: 8

Samuel Stillman Pierce (March 27, 1807 – October 12, 1880) was an American grocer who established the S. S. Pierce company in 1831.

== Biography ==
Pierce was born in Cedar Grove, Dorchester, on March 27, 1807. In 1836, he married Ellen Maria Wallis. They had eight children. The family lived in the South End and Dorchester. He died at his home in Boston on October 12, 1880.

=== S. S. Pierce & Co. ===
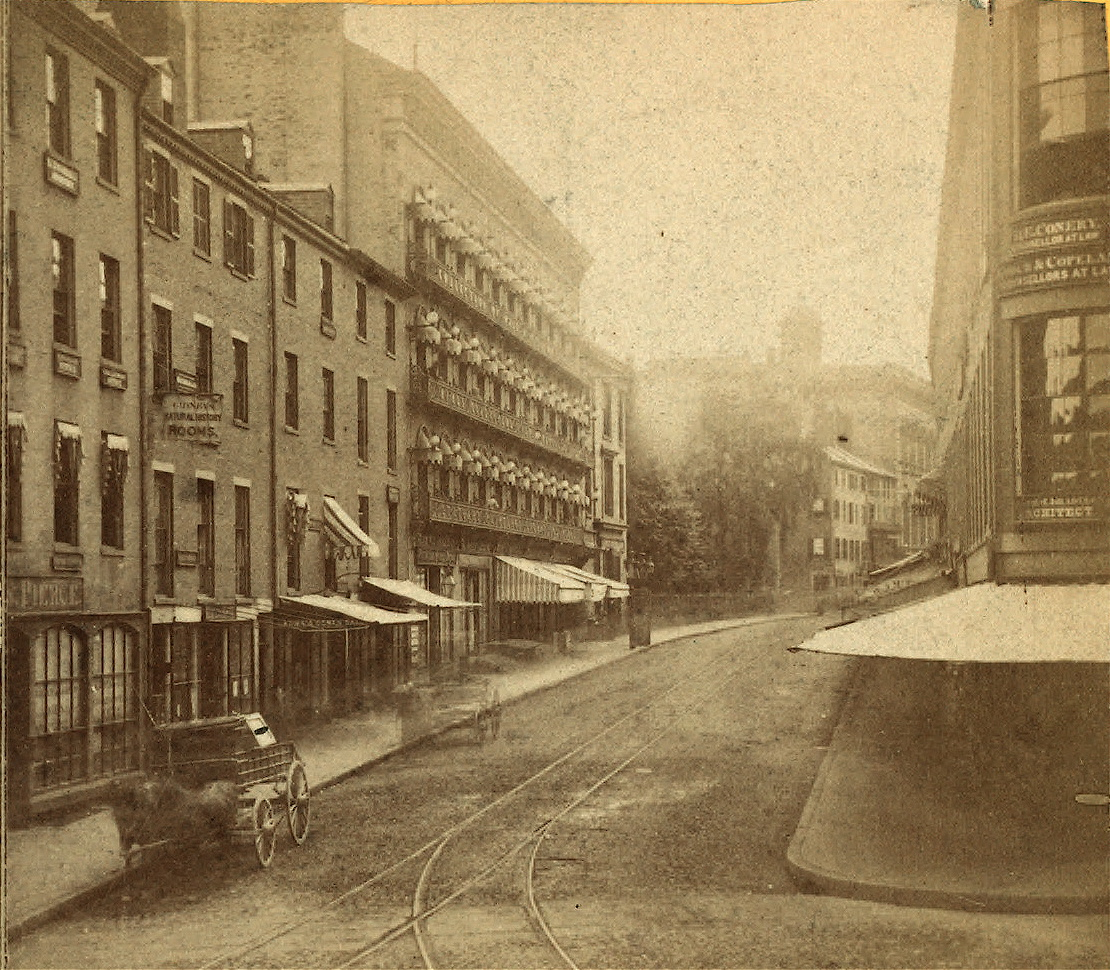
S. S. Pierce storefront (far left), corner of Tremont St. and Court St., Boston, 19th century

In 1831, Pierce and his partner, Eldad Worcester, "started out by wholesaling provisions to the ships that crowded what was then a very busy Boston Harbor, but soon enough Pierce was bartering with ship captains, often exchanging his provisions for the delicacies they would bring to Boston from faraway ports." Pierce said, "I may not make money, but I shall make a reputation."

The grocery business thrived, due in part to "celebrity customers ... John Quincy Adams, Daniel Webster," and Oliver Wendell Holmes Sr. who said: "I was brought up on S.S. Pierce's groceries and I don't dare change."

The 1886 catalog for S. S. Pierce & Co., Importers and Grocers lists myriad items for sale in its Grocery, Wine, Cigar, and Perfumery Departments: gelatine; isinglass; chutneys; French vegetables in glass jars; Alghieri's soups; Wiesbaden goods; wines; Russian cigarettes; Egyptian cigarettes; quadruple essences; tooth brushes; soaps assorted; inexhaustible salts; and much more.

In 1887, the company moved from the corner of Tremont and Court Streets to Copley Square, into a new building designed by architect S. Edwin Tobey. Architecture critic Robert Campbell has observed of the building: "It's no masterpiece of architecture, but it's great urban design. A heap of dark Romanesque masonry, it anchored a corner of Copley Square as solidly as a mountain." The building was demolished in 1958.

In 1892, S. S. Pierce, under Wallace Pierce, the son of the founder, purchased the former Coolidge & Brother store, a two-story wooden building in Coolidge Corner, Brookline that had been on the site since 1857 and opened a branch at that location. Six years later, the company built a new Tudor-style building with a clock tower featuring an open deck. The tower was damaged in a storm in 1948 and replaced with a new tower, minus the open deck. The building still stands as a historically significant landmark today.

In addition to a wide variety of goods for sale, the company provided notable customer service.

The company hired horse-drawn sleighs to deliver groceries when snowstorms closed roads to auto traffic, and maintained a well-drilled corps of salesmen who would phone housewives at appointed hours. They not only suggested menus but answered such arcane questions as how to cook an ostrich egg (boil it) or how to extract the flavor from a 6-in. vanilla bean (bury a 1-in. cutting from the bean for a month in a pound of sugar). Once when a hostess in Poughkeepsie, N.Y., complained that a case of turtle soup had not arrived, a Pierce salesman took an overnight train to deliver it in person — just in time for her party.

In 1972, the S. S. Pierce company was sold to Seneca Foods Corp., of New York. which adopted the name S. S. Pierce until the 1980s.

== Images ==
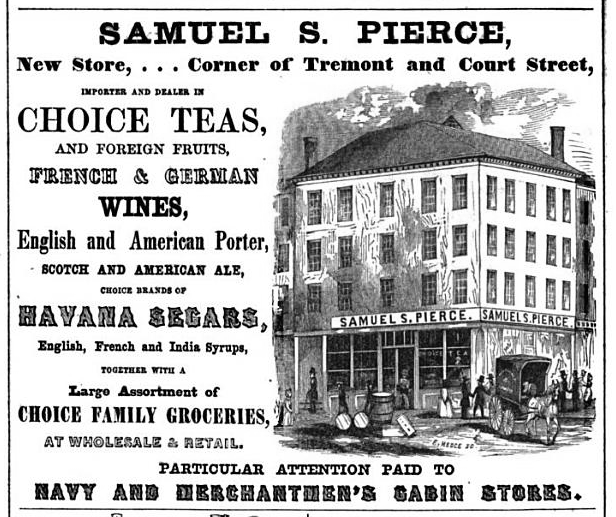
1852 advertisement for Samuel S. Pierce

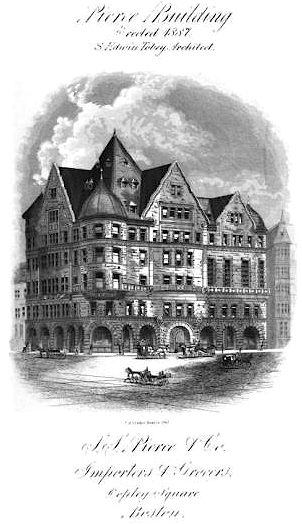
S. S. Pierce building, Copley Square, 1892

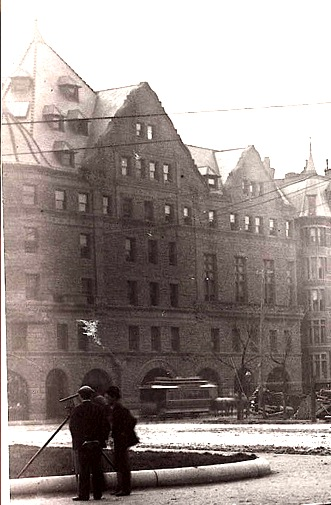
S. S. Pierce & Co., Copley Square, Boston, 1889

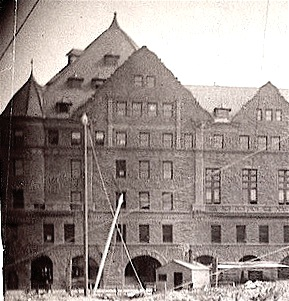
S. S. Pierce & Co., Copley Square, Boston, 1888

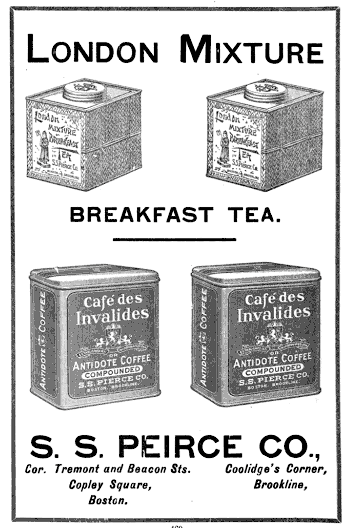
1905 advertisement for S. S. Peirce [sic] & Co.
