= Eliphalet J. Foss =

American photographer

Eliphalet J. Foss or E.J. Foss (1840–1922 or 1923) was an American photographer active in Boston, Massachusetts. He lived and worked on Tremont Row. He belonged to the Boston Photographic Association; contemporaries included Thomas Rice Burnham. Around 1880, his business was taken over by A.B. Eaton. Examples of his work are in Harvard University, the Henry Ford Museum, and Massachusetts Historical Society. His wife was elocutionist Louise Woodworth Foss.
