= Palace Theatre (Boston) =

Coordinates: 42°21′39.32″N 71°3′37.85″W

The Palace Theatre (ca.1891-1931) of Boston, Massachusetts, United States, was a variety theatre on Court Street in the late 19th and early 20th centuries. Acts which performed there included Rose Hill Folly Co., Clifford & Dixon, Murry & Murry, Behler & Stone, and the Adamless Eden Burlesquers. It also showed photo-plays such as The Exploits of Elaine, The Master Key, and "Charles Chaplin comedies." Among its managers and proprietors were William Austin, F. J. Pilling, George Milbank, and Dunn & Waldron. The Palace occupied the building of the former Nickelodeon. It existed until 1931, when it was demolished.

== Images ==
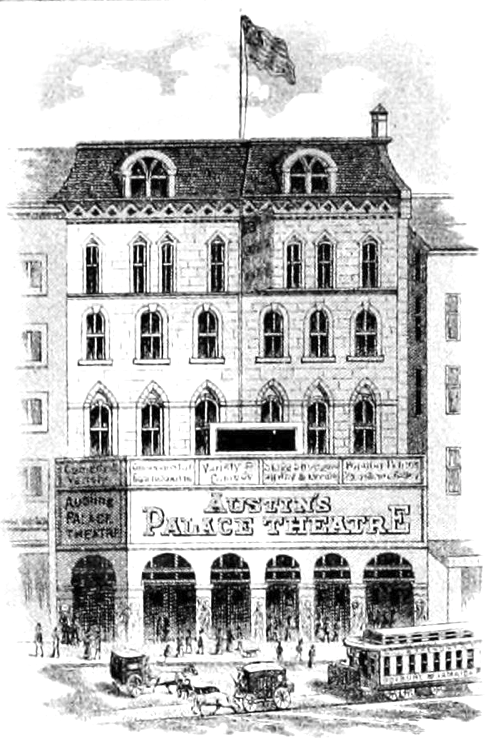
Austin's Palace Theatre, 1890s

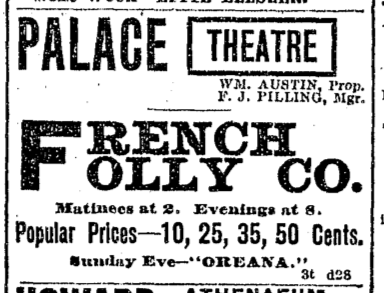
Advertisement, 1893

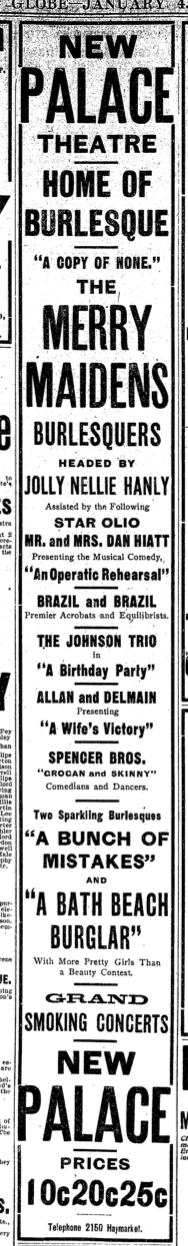
Advertisement, 1903

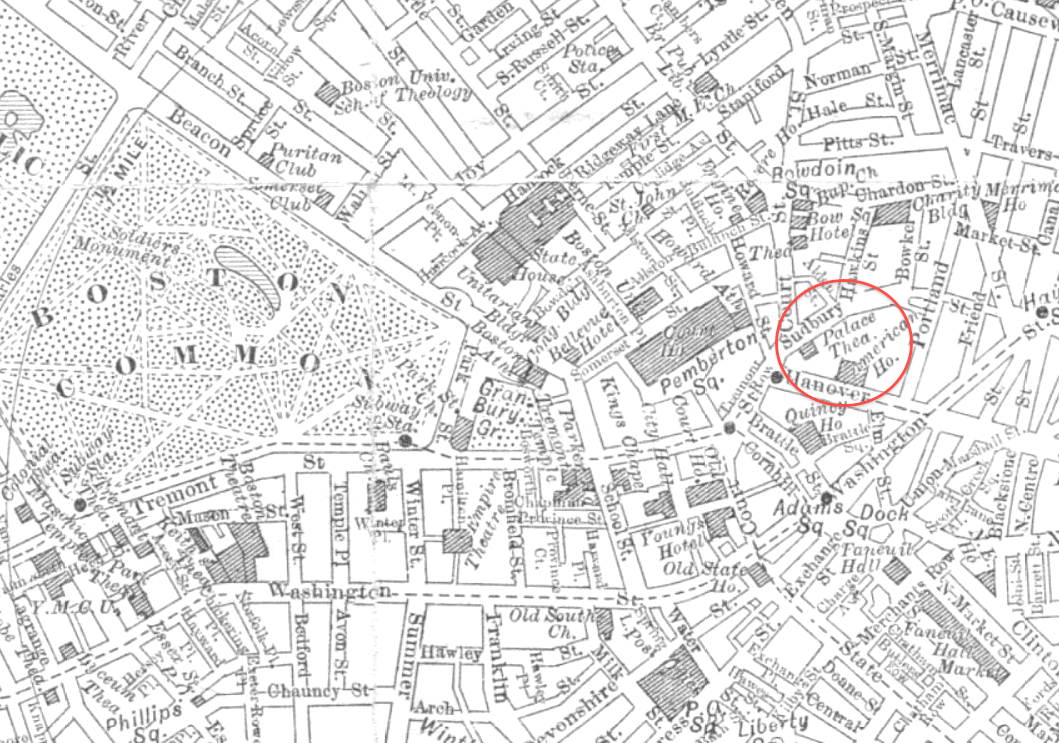
Detail of 1911 map of Boston, showing the Palace at Court and Sudbury Streets

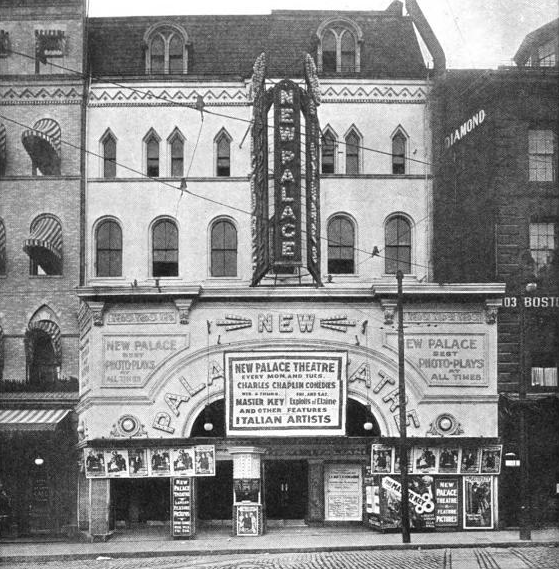
Palace Theatre, ca.1916
