= Alvan Clark & Sons =

American maker of optics

Coordinates: 42.35528°N 71.10927°W

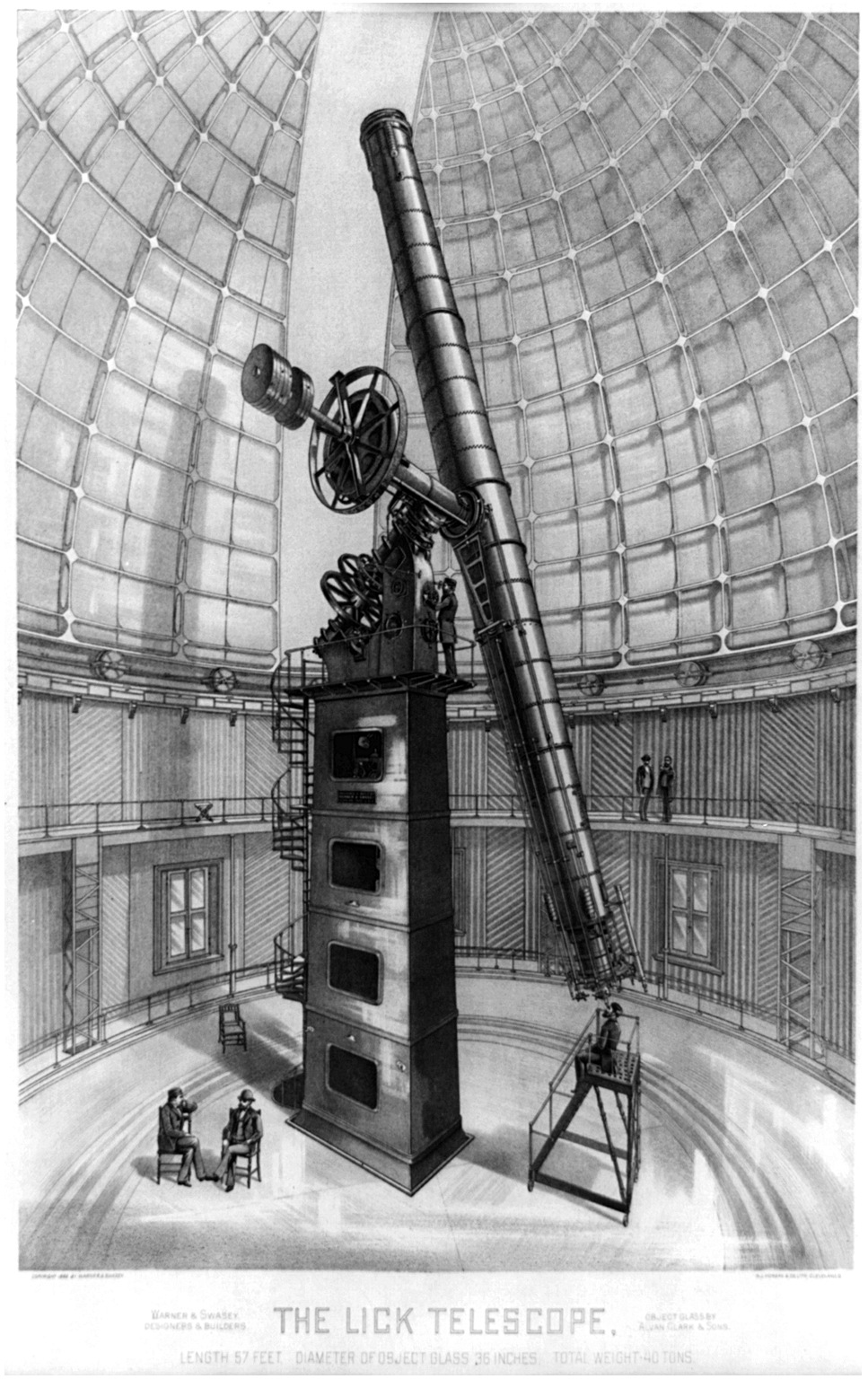
Alvan Clark & Sons made the 36-inch (910 mm) objective lens for the Lick Observatory refractor, shown here in an 1889 drawing. The telescope was designed and built by the Warner & Swasey Company

Alvan Clark & Sons was an American maker of optics that became famous for crafting lenses for some of the largest refracting telescopes of the 19th and early 20th centuries. Founded in 1846 in Cambridgeport, Massachusetts, by Alvan Clark (1804–1887, a descendant of Cape Cod whalers who started as a portrait painter, and his sons George Bassett Clark (1827–1891) and Alvan Graham Clark (1832–1897). Five times, the firm built the largest refracting telescopes in the world. The Clark firm gained "worldwide fame and distribution", wrote one author on astronomy in 1899.

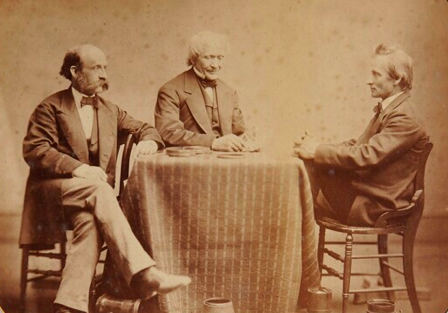
Portrait of Clark and sons, circa 1870s (photo by T.R. Burnham)

The 18.5-inch (470 mm) Dearborn telescope (housed successively at the University of Chicago, Northwestern University and Adler Planetarium) was commissioned in 1856 by the University of Mississippi. The outbreak of the Civil War prevented them from ever taking ownership. As a result, it was being tested in Cambridgeport when Alvan Graham observed Sirius B in 1862.

In 1873 they built the 26-inch (660 mm) objective lens for the refractor at the United States Naval Observatory. In 1883, they built the 30-inch (760 mm) telescope for the Pulkovo Observatory in Russia, the 36-inch (910 mm) objective for the refractor at Lick Observatory was made in 1887, and the 40-inch (1,000 mm) lens for the Yerkes Observatory refractor, in 1897, only ever exceeded in size by the lens made for Great Paris Exhibition Telescope of 1900.

The company also built a number of smaller instruments, which are still highly prized among collectors and amateur astronomers.

The company's assets were acquired by the Sprague-Hathaway Manufacturing Company in 1933, but continued to operate under the Clark name. In 1936, Sprague-Hathaway moved the Clark shop to a new location in West Somerville, Massachusetts, where manufacturing continued in association with the Perkin-Elmer Corporation, another maker of precision instruments. Most of Clark's equipment was disposed of as scrap during World War II, and Sprague-Hathaway itself was liquidated in 1958.

Alvan Clark & Sons Telescopes

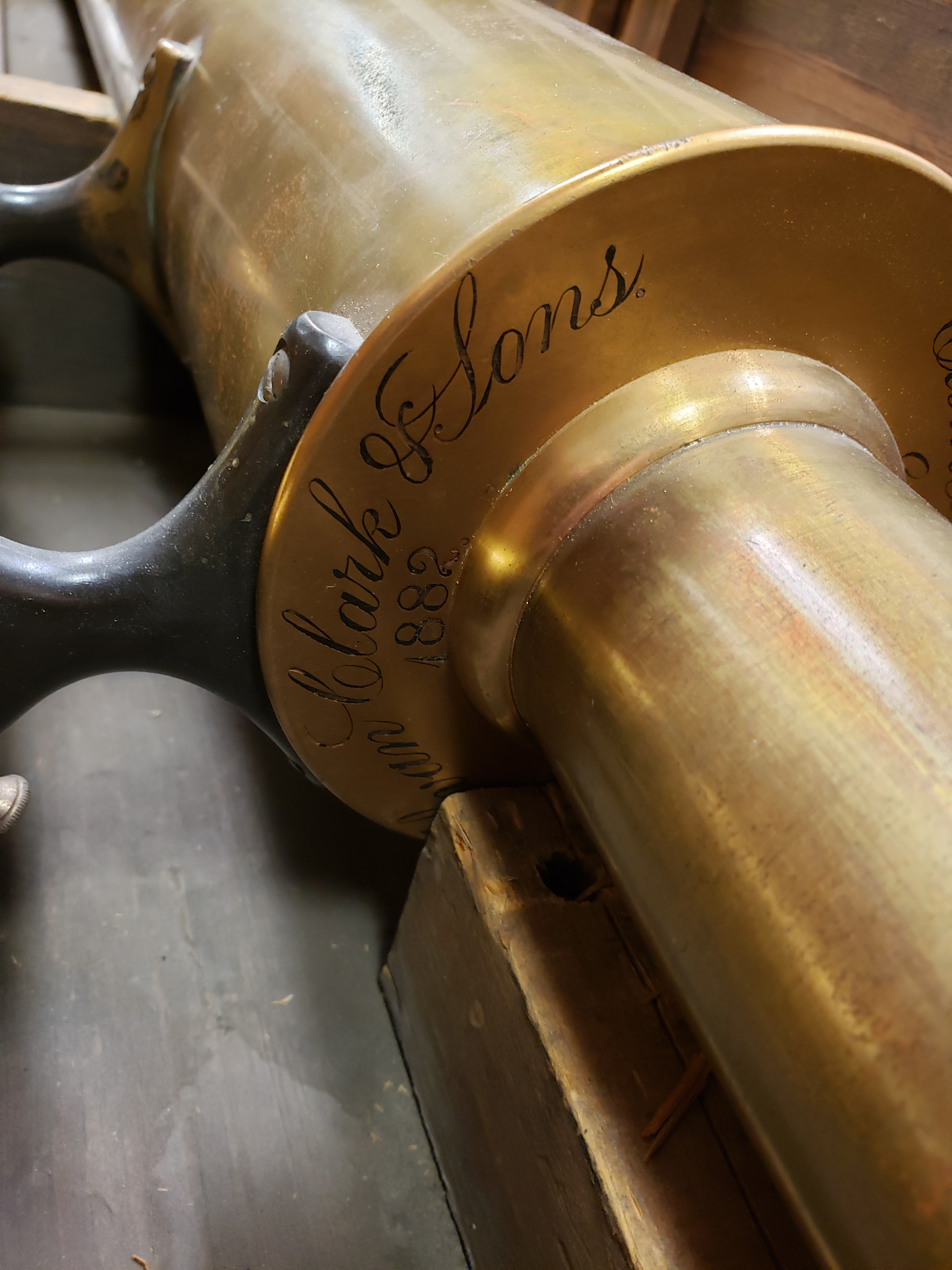
4" telescope at Rockford University, 2021.

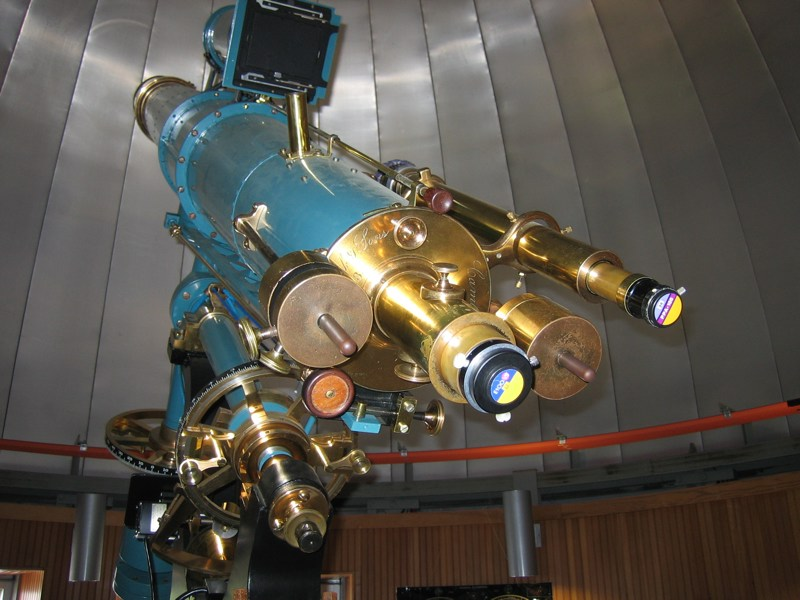
8" telescope at Chabot Space and Science Center

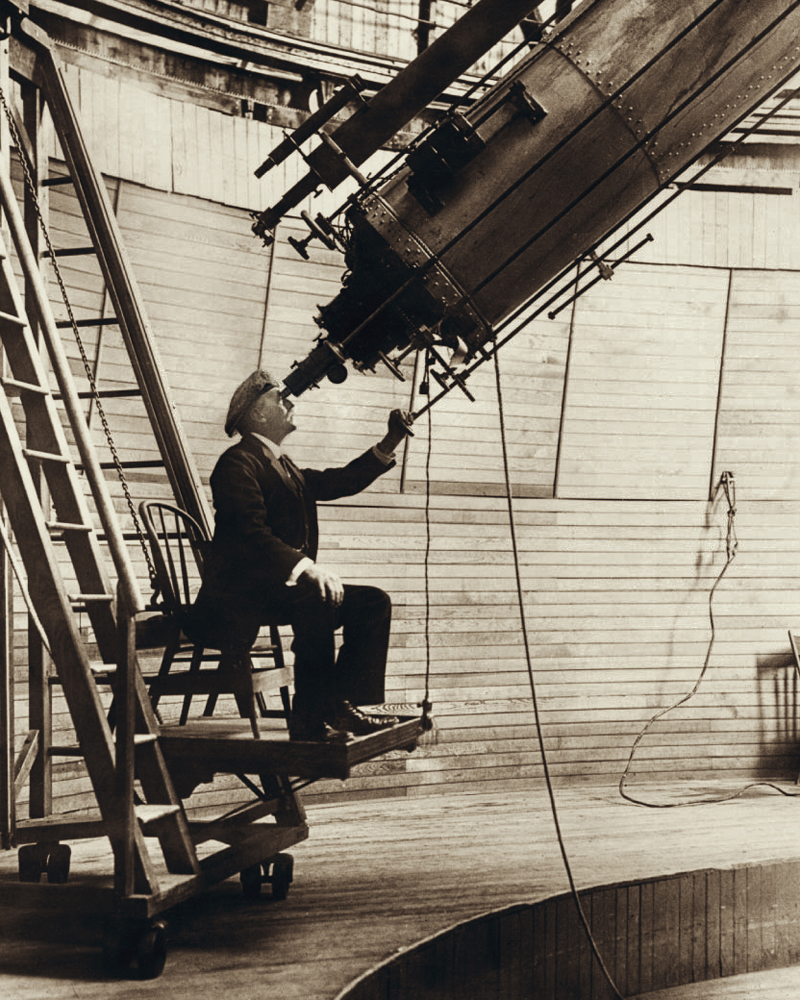
24" telescope at Lowell Observatory

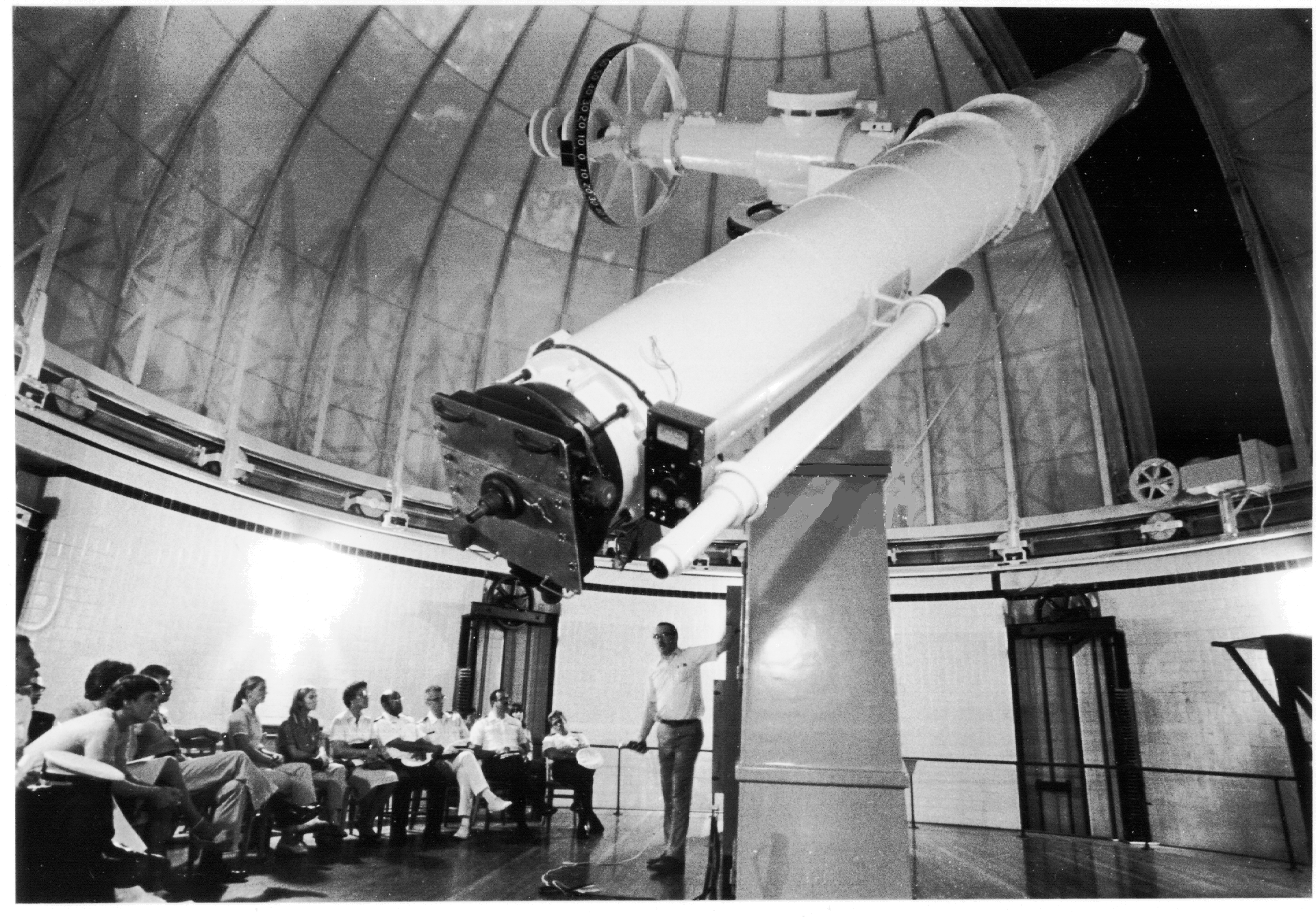
26" telescope at United States Naval Observatory

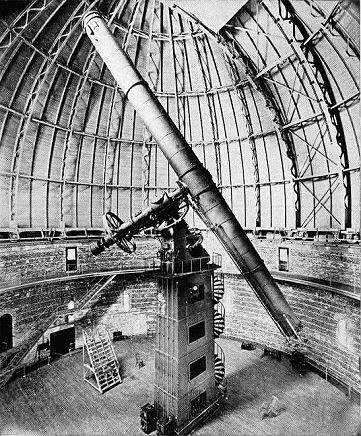
40" telescope at Yerkes Observatory, 1897

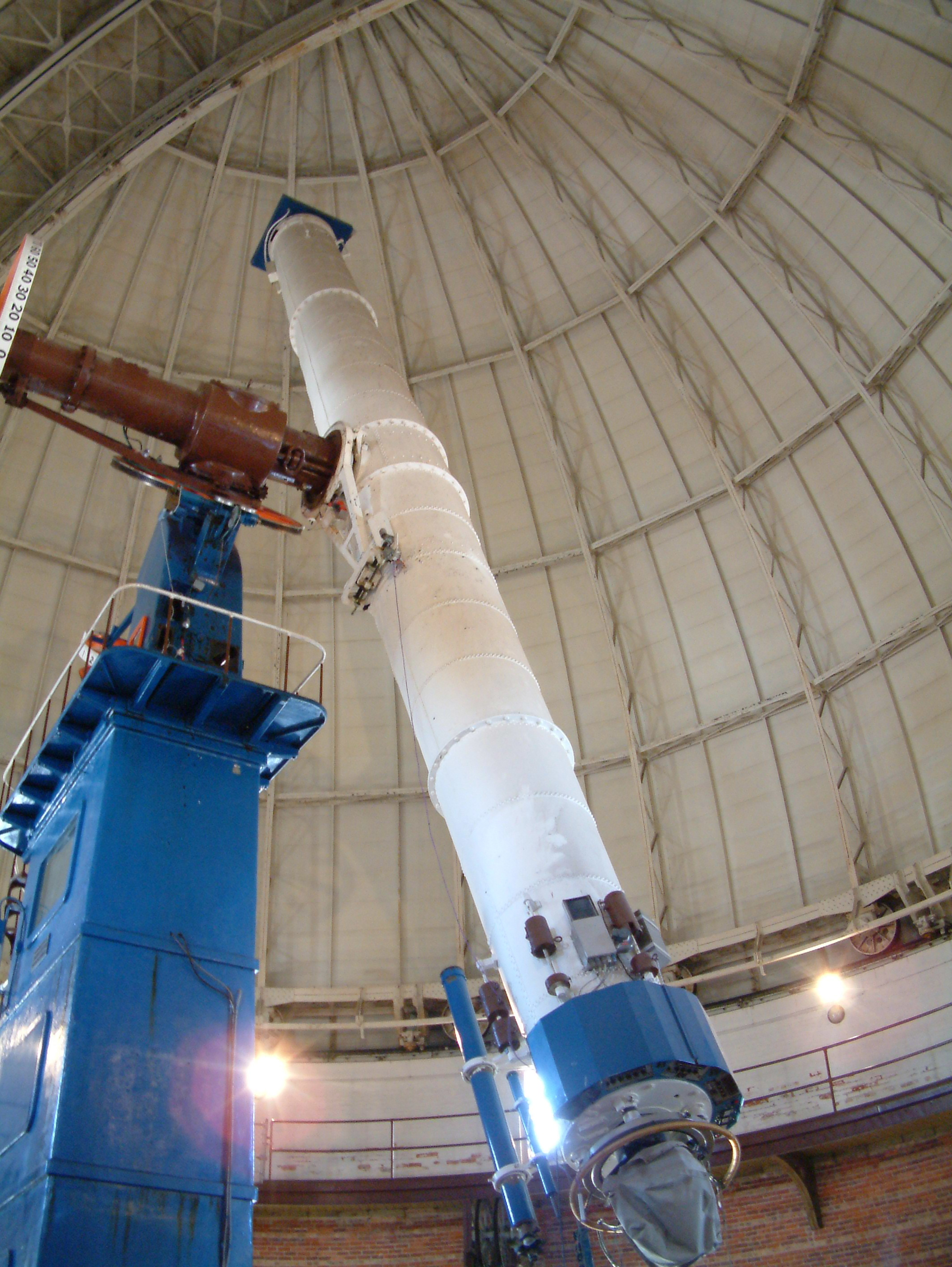
40" telescope at Yerkes Observatory, 2006

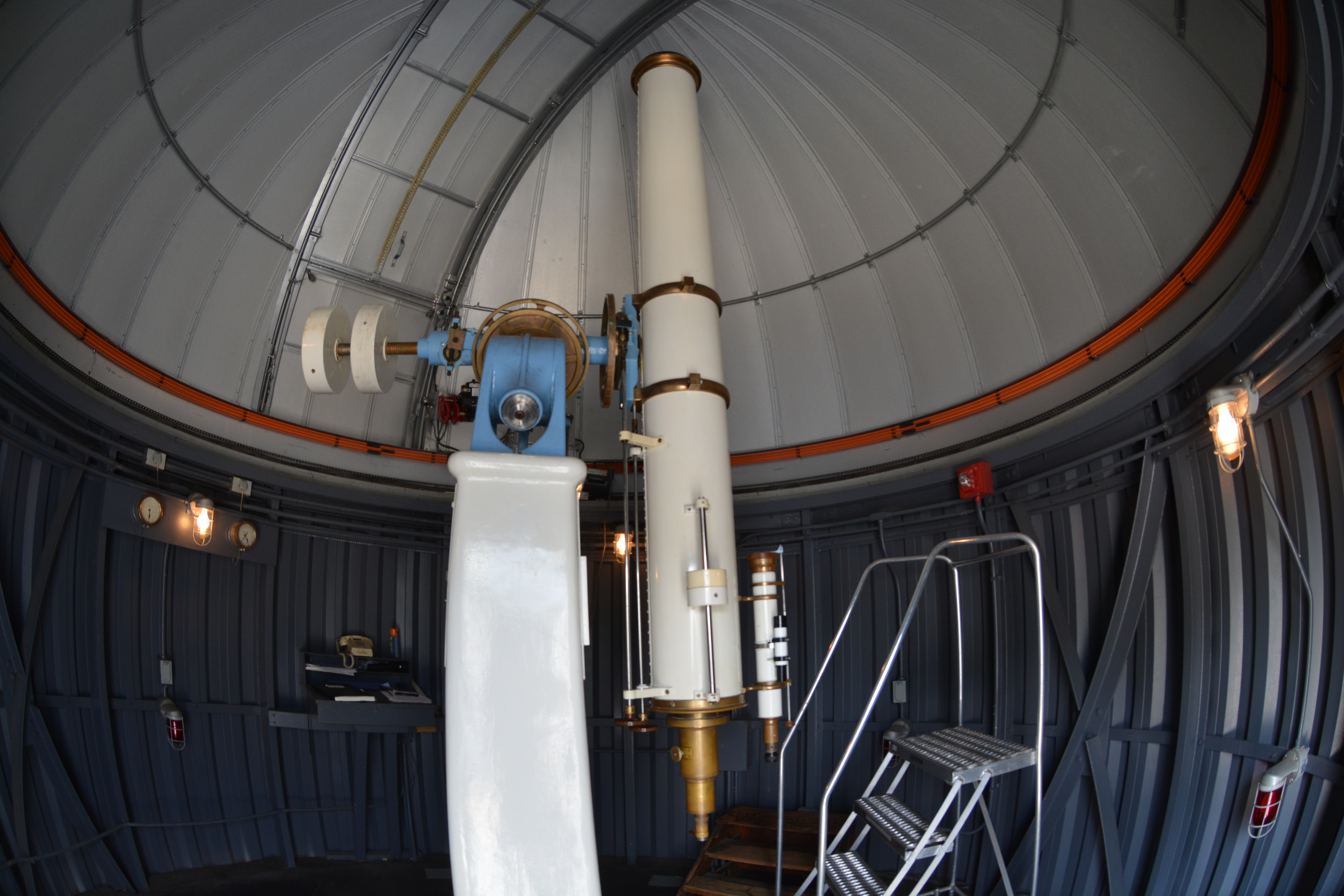
The 9-inch Clark Refractor at Harvard Observatory, 2015

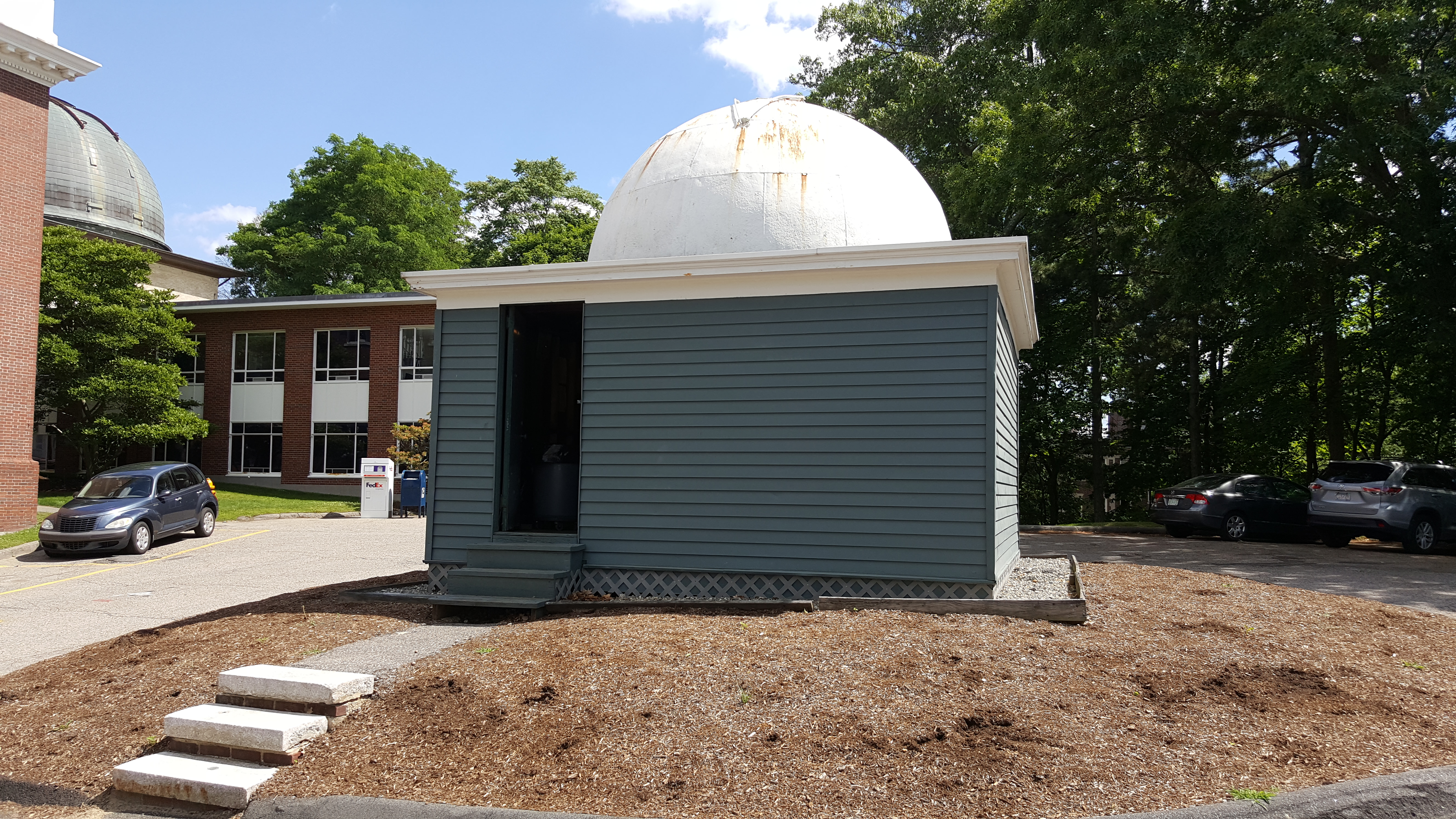
The 7.5-inch Clark telescope dome at Harvard, in 2016

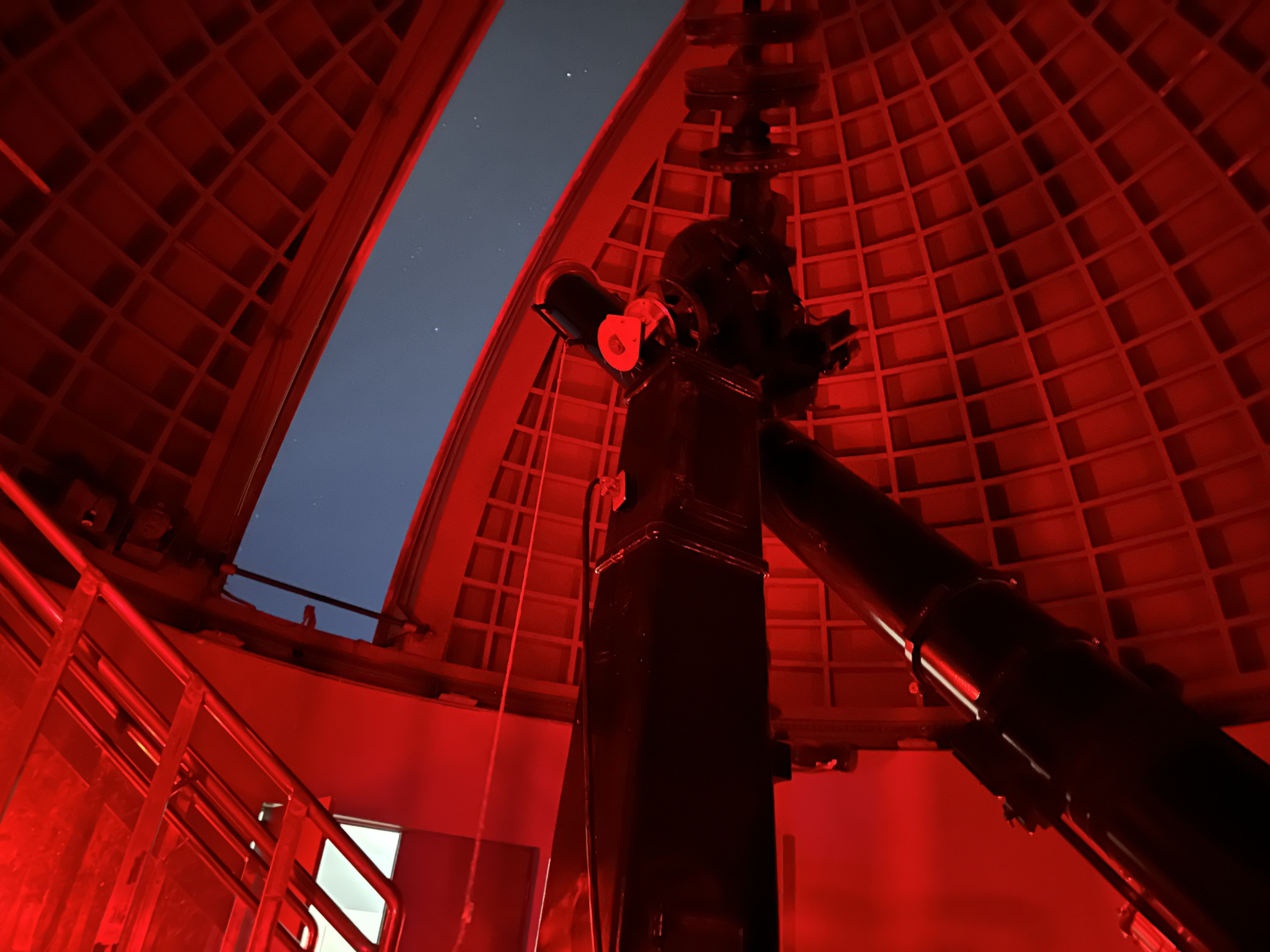
12" telescope at Jewett Observatory at Washington State University, 2024

== See also ==
- Chabot Space & Science Center, Oakland, California
- Charles Sumner Tainter
