= Samuel Hall Gregory =

American interior decorator (1814–1892)

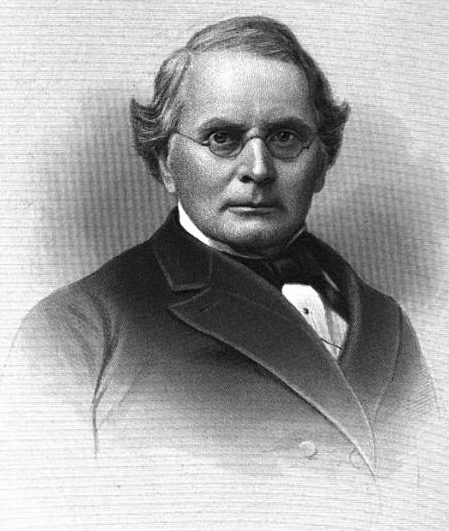
Portrait of S.H. Gregory, 19th century

Samuel Hall Gregory (1814 – 1892) was an interior decorator and wallpaper manufacturer, importer and retailer in Boston.

He worked in Boston with a succession of business partners: C. Dudley Brown, James H. Foster, S.M. Hurlbert, Charles W. Robinson, and also with T. Christy and S.S. Constant of New York. In 1852, Gregory served on the board of the newly established Boston YMCA, the first YMCA chapter in the United States. He worked on Court Street (1840s-1870s) and West Street (1880s) in Boston, and lived in Brookline, Massachusetts.

== Image gallery ==
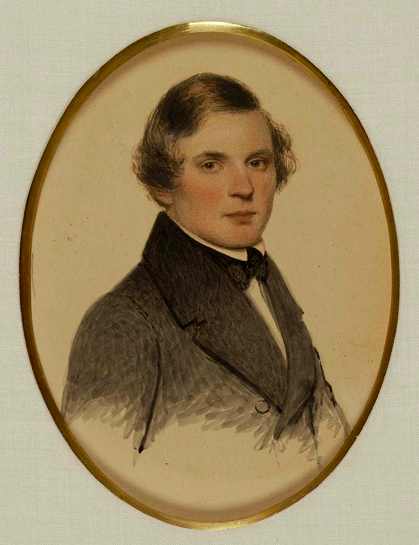
Portrait of Gregory by Alvan Clark, c. 1840s

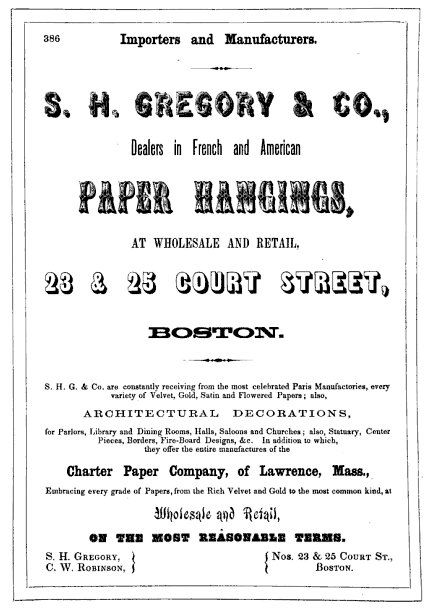
Advertisement, S.H. Gregory & Co., Court St., Boston, 1854

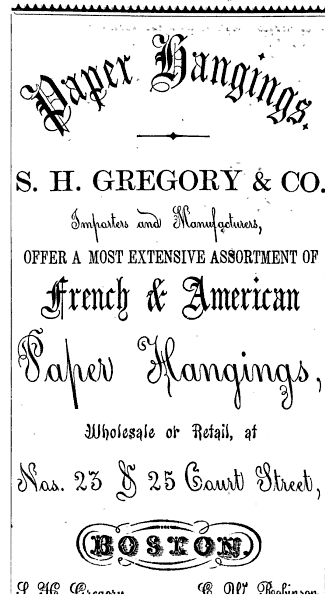
Advertisement, S.H. Gregory & Co., Court St., Boston, 1870

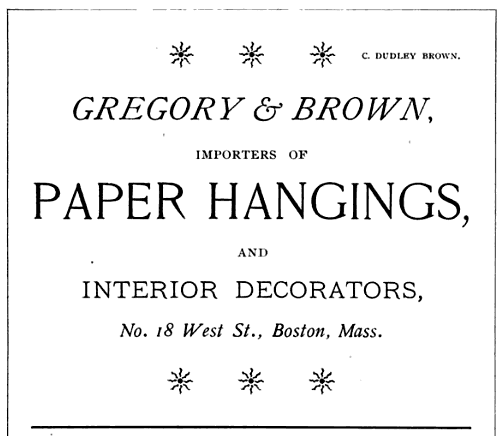
Advertisement, Gregory & Brown, West St., Boston, 1887
