= Thomas Rice Burnham =

American photographer

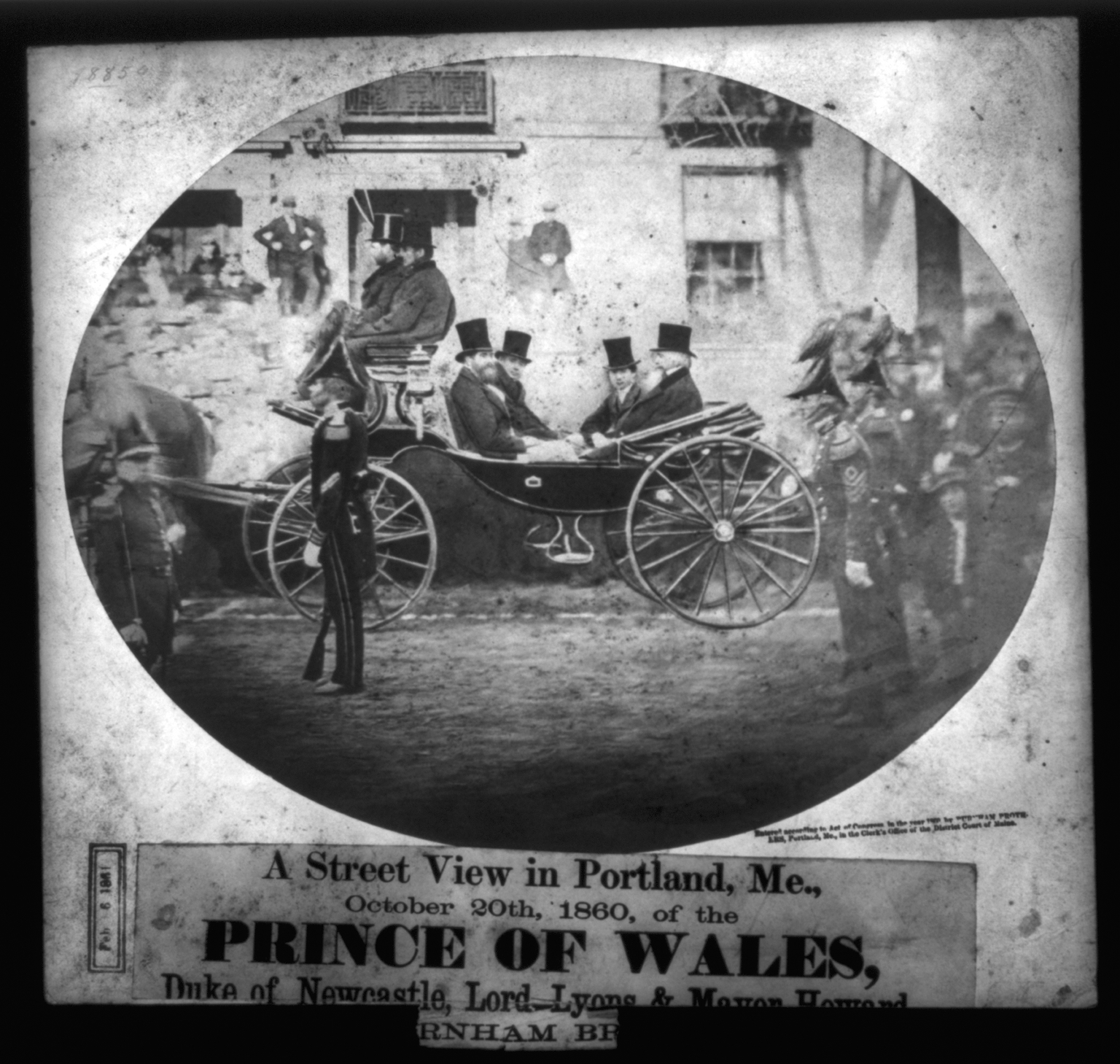
Burnham Bros. photograph of the Prince of Wales in Portland, Maine, 1860. US Library of Congress

Thomas Rice Burnham (1834-1893) or T.R. Burnham was an American photographer. In the 1860s he worked in Maine with Asa Marsh Burnham as "Burnham Bros." (Note: Asa M. Burnham (1825-1879) lived in Bangor, Maine in the 1850s.) He later moved to Boston, Massachusetts and operated from a studio on Washington Street until at least 1885. (Note: In the 1870s a fire occurred at the Burnham-owned no.130 Shawmut Avenue in Boston.) He belonged to the Boston Photographic Society and/or Boston Association of Photographers; among his contemporaries were J.W. Black, E.J. Foss, and E.F. Smith. Portrait subjects included Edwin Booth, Alvan Clark & Sons, Edw M Endicott, Clement Granch, Ulysses S. Grant, William Stevens Perry, George Antony Smalley, and Nathan and Mary Barrett Warren. Burnham showed photos in the 1876 Philadelphia Centennial Exposition and the 1887 exhibition of the Massachusetts Charitable Mechanic Association.
