= Jewett Observatory =

Observatory in Washington state, US

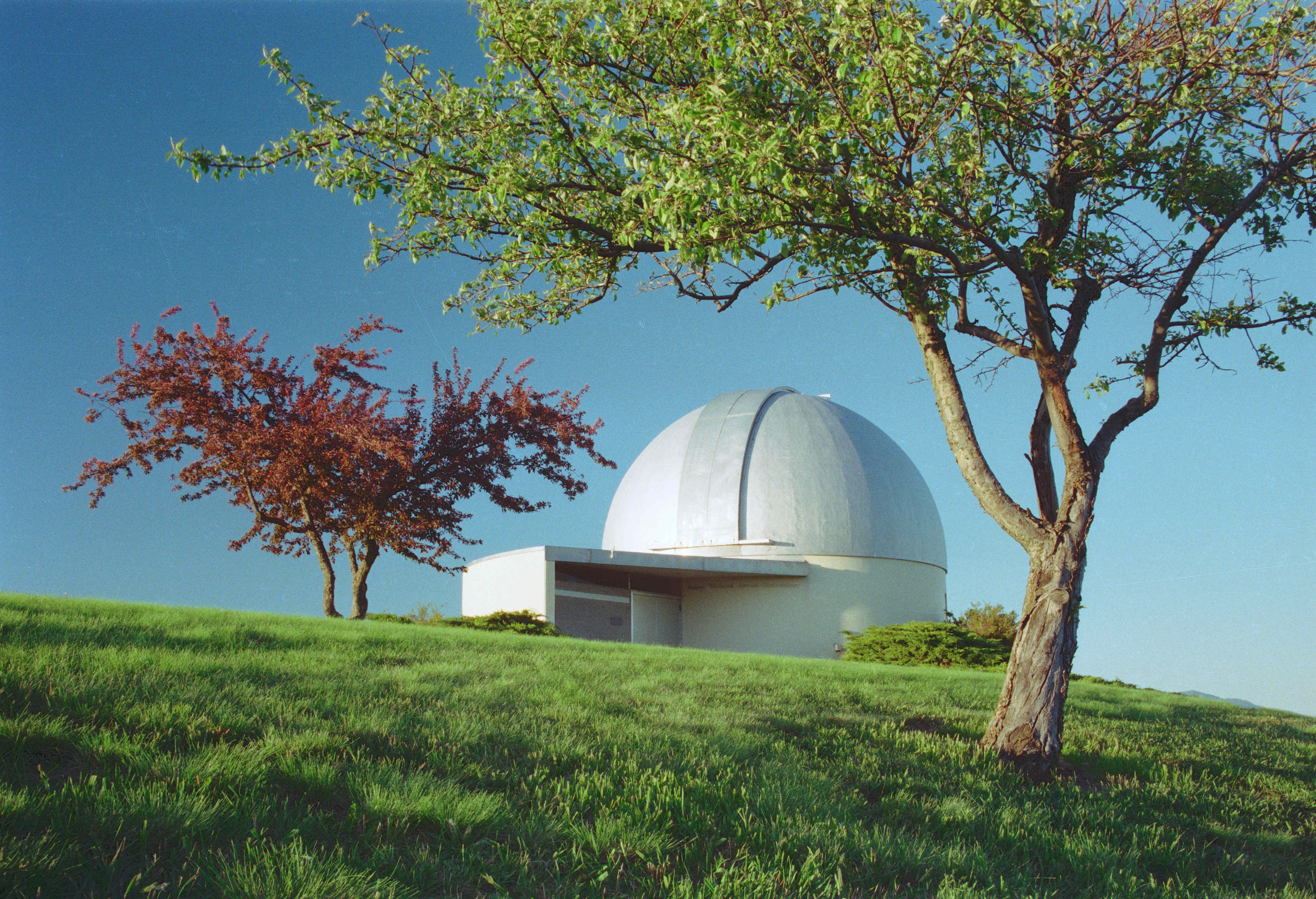
- Alternative names: James Richard Jewett Observatory
- Organization: Washington State University
- Location: Pullman, Washington
- Coordinates: 46°43′43″N 117°09′11″W
- Altitude: 790 m (2,590 ft)
- Website: astro.wsu.edu/observatory.html
- Telescopes: 12-inch Alvan Clark & Sons telescope
- Related media on Commons

The James Richard Jewett Observatory is an astronomical observatory owned and operated by Washington State University. It is located in Pullman, Washington (US). It houses the largest refracting telescope in the state of Washington. The 12-inch lens was originally ground and polished between 1887 and 1889 by Alvan Clark & Sons for an amateur astronomer, who died before the telescope could be assembled. The lens was put into storage, and was purchased by the university when it came up for auction in the 1950s. Its present dome was dedicated in 1953 and it is named after the father of a supporter of the observatory, Mr. George Jewett of Spokane.

The observatory is not used for research purposes; it is primarily used for undergraduate student labs and training, and houses twelve portable telescopes for this purpose. Additionally, the telescope is open for use to any students who have been instructed in its use, as well as to the public on monthly star party nights.

== In popular culture ==
The observatory is featured in the 2013 American romantic comedy film At Middleton. Andy Garcia's character, George, refers to it as a planetarium and is repeatedly corrected by Vera Farmiga's character, Edith, and their respective children.

== See also ==
- List of observatories
