= Court Street (Boston) =

Street in Boston, Massachusetts

Coordinates: 42°21′31.39″N 71°03′29.66″W

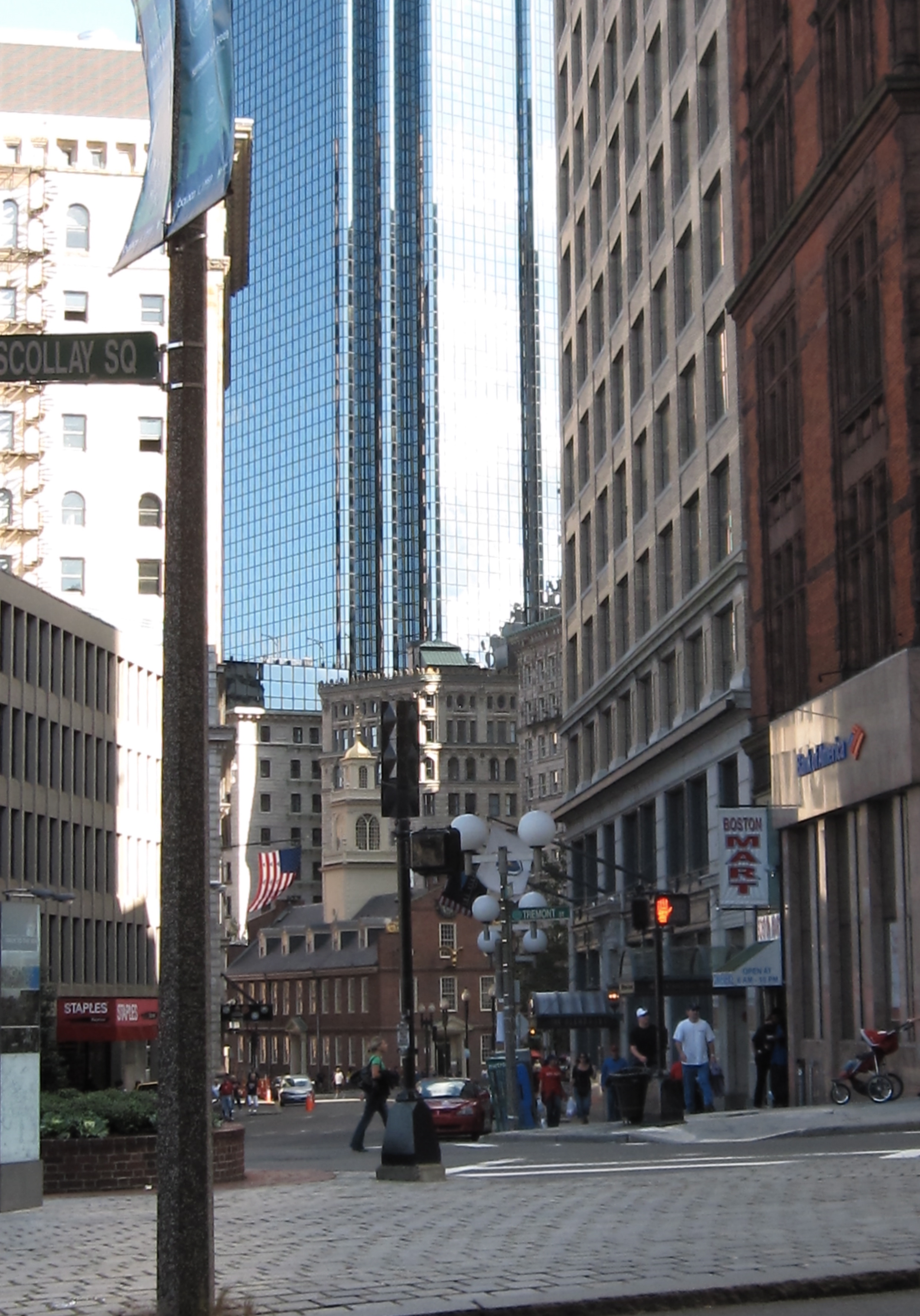
- Court Street, Boston, 2009
- Interactive map of Court Street
- Location: Boston
- West end: State Street / Washington Street
- East end: Tremont Street / Cambridge Street

Construction
- Commissioned: July 4, 1788

Court Street (est. July 4, 1788) is located in the Financial District of Boston, Massachusetts. Prior to 1788, it was called Prison Lane (1634–1708) and then Queen Street (1708–1788). In the 19th century it extended beyond its current length, to Bowdoin Square. In the 1960s most of Court Street was demolished to make way for the construction of Government Center. The remaining street extends a few blocks, near the Old State House on State Street.

== Tenants of Court Street ==
- Ames Building

Former tenants

- American Magazine of Useful and Entertaining Knowledge
- Annin & Smith, 19th-century engravers
- Boston Daily Advertiser
- Boston Gaol (Massachusetts), 1635–1822
- Concert Hall (Boston, Massachusetts)
- S.H. Gregory & Co., wallpaper, 1840s–1870s
- Elias Howe Company music publisher
- Independent Chronicle
- Charles H. Keith, music & umbrellas, 1840s–1850s
- Munroe & Francis, publishers
- The New-England Courant
- Palace Theatre
- S.S. Pierce, grocer, 19th century
- Henry Prentiss, music & umbrellas, 1830s–1850s
- New-England Museum (Boston)
- N.S. Simpkins' bookshop, 1820s
- William Tudor
- Young's Hotel (Boston)

== Images ==
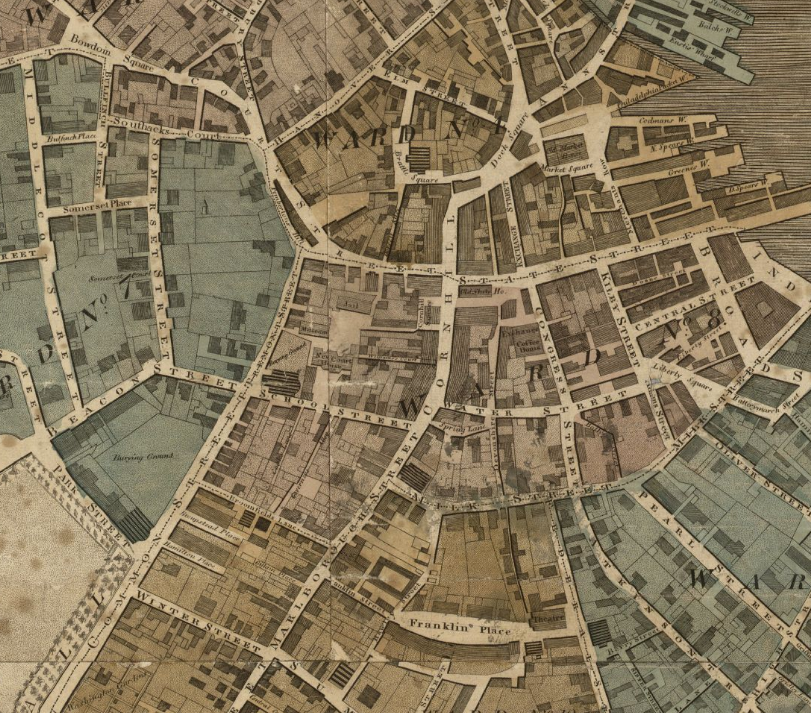
Detail of 1814 map of Boston, showing Court St. extending to Bowdoin Square

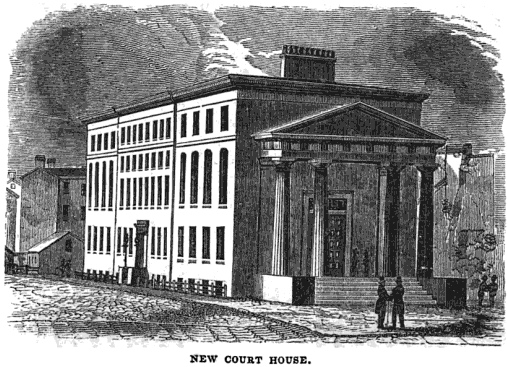
Court House, c. 1838 (engraving by Abel Bowen)

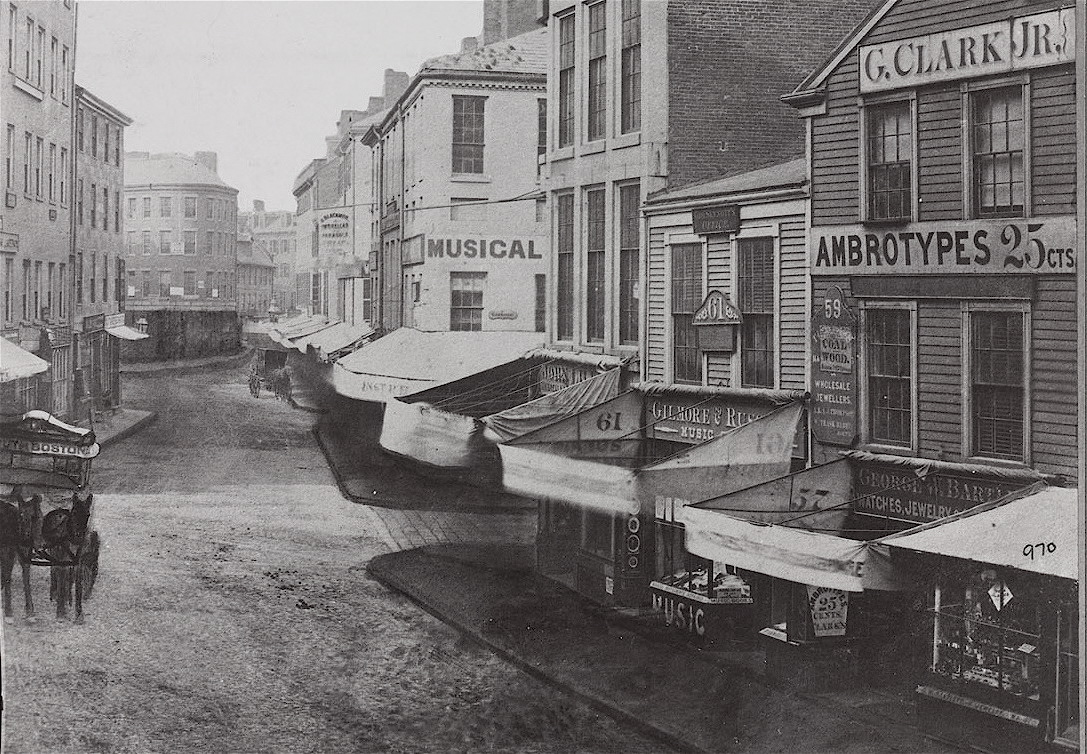
c. 1855

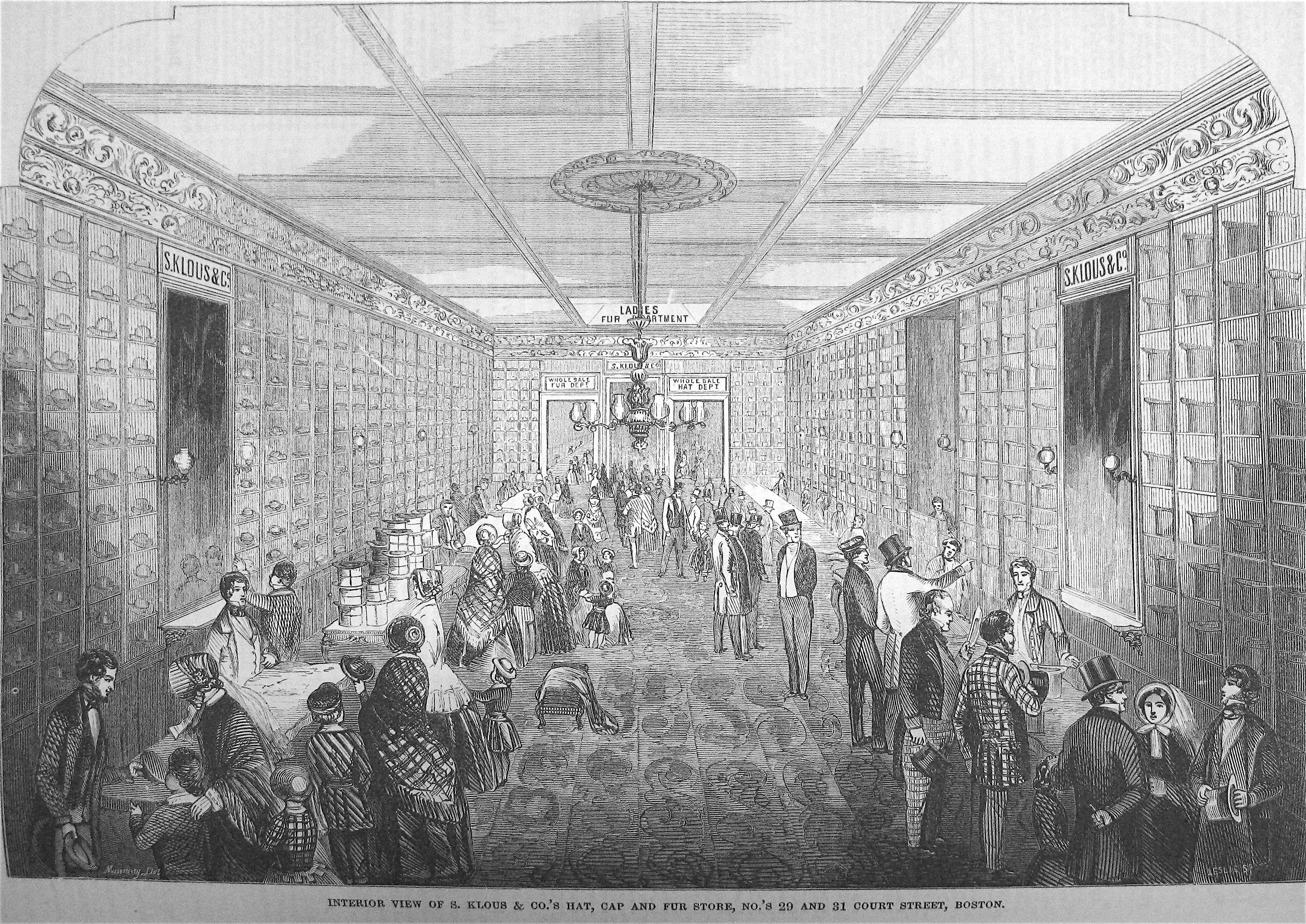
S. Klous & Co. Hat, Cap, and Fur Store, Court St., 1850s (illustration from Gleason's Pictorial Drawing-Room Companion)

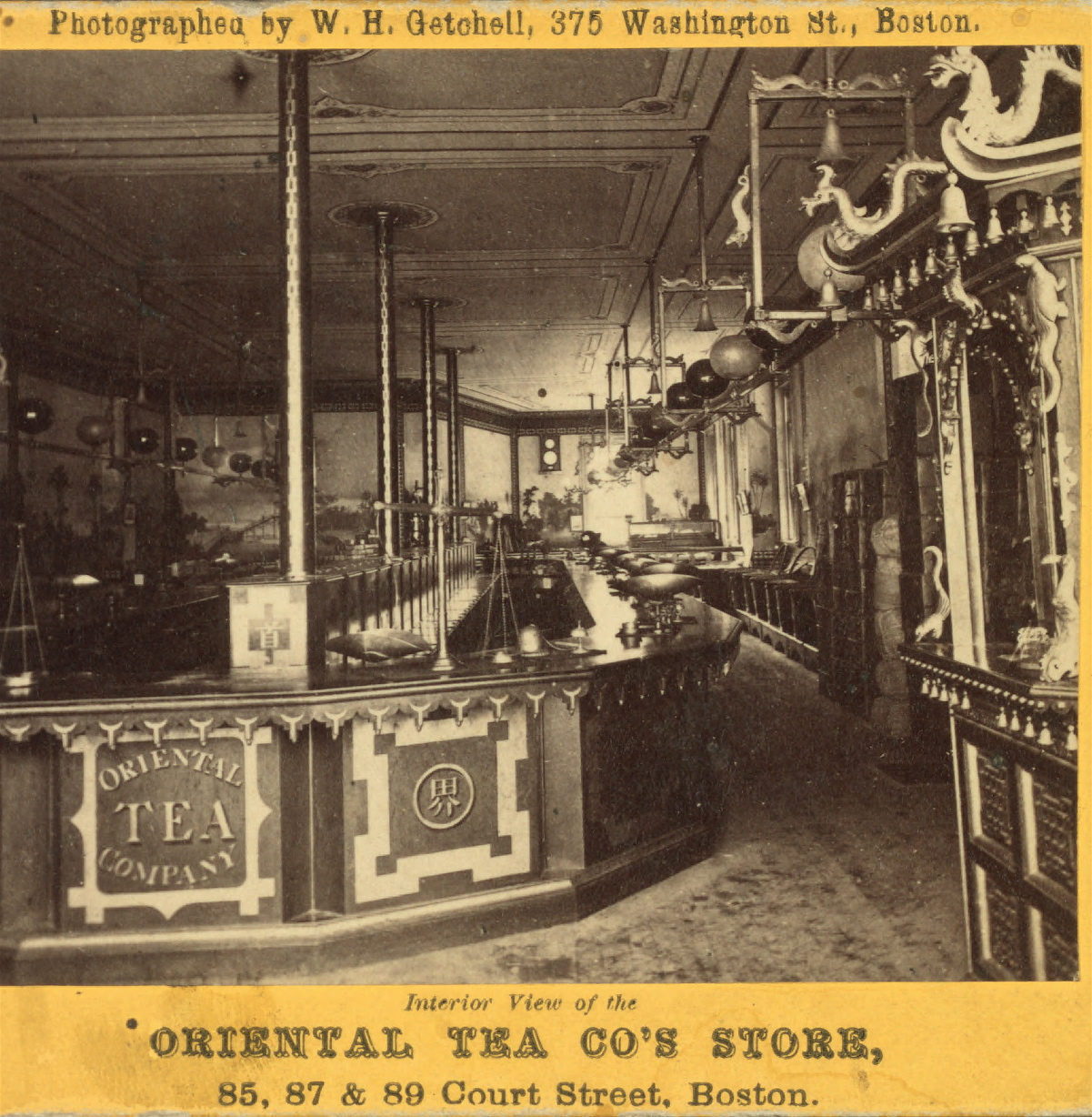
Oriental Tea Co., 85, 87, 89 Court St. (photo by William H. Getchell)

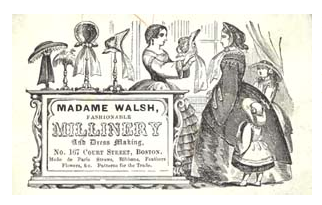
Madame Walsh, millinery, Court St., 19th century

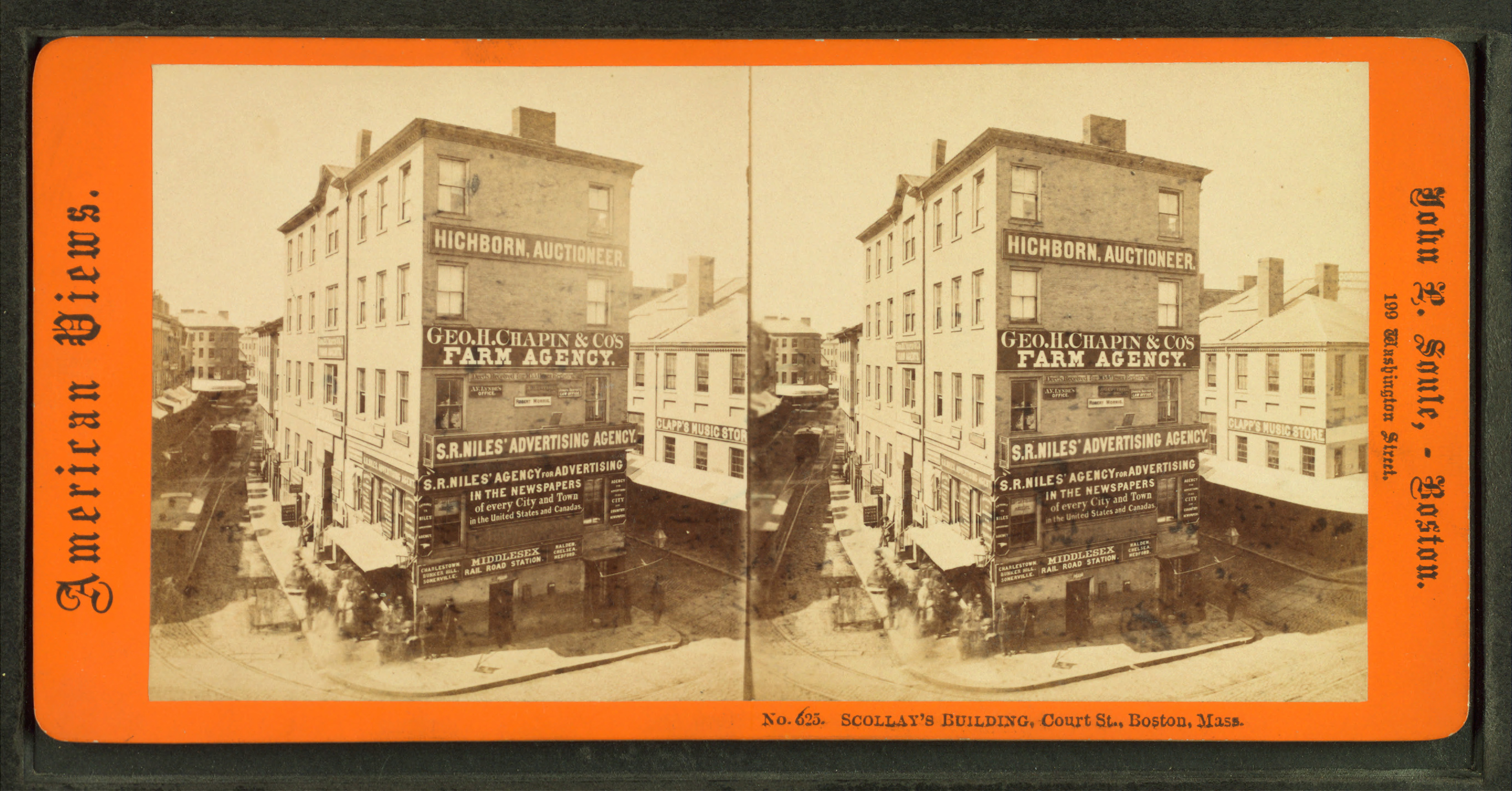
Scollay's building, Court St., 19th century (stereograph by John P. Soule)

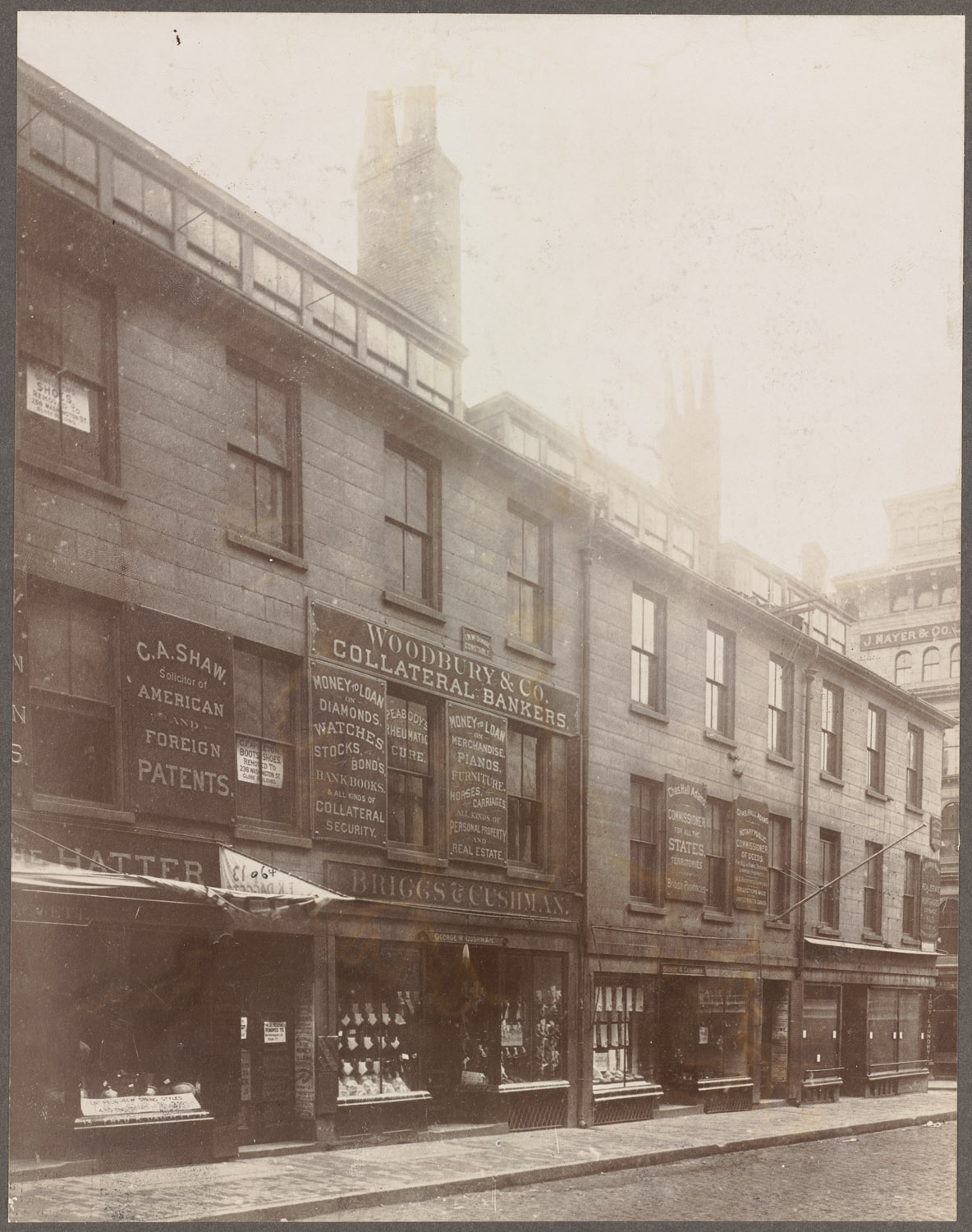
c. 1880s
