= Elias Colbert =

British-American astronomer, journalist, educator, mathematician, linguist and professor

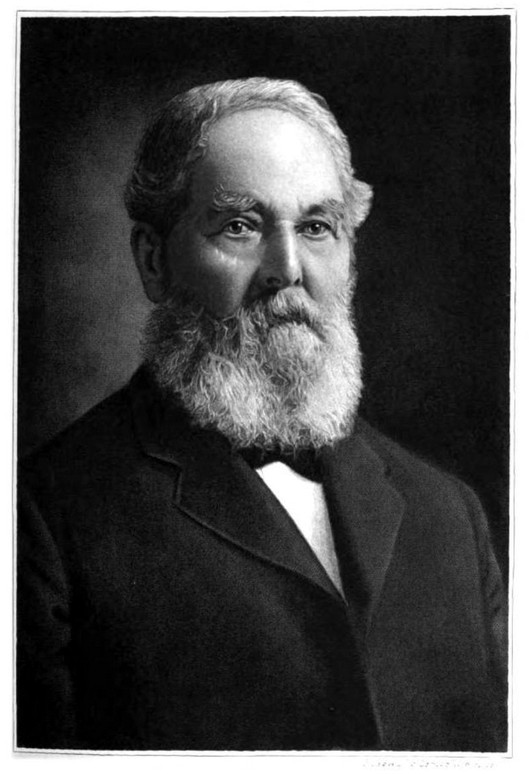
Elias Colbert

Elias Colbert (April 23, 1829 - June 28, 1921) was a British American astronomer, journalist, educator, mathematician, linguist, professor at the University of Chicago, director of the Dearborn Observatory, and president of the Chicago Astronomical Society. His book, Star Studies: What We Know of the Universe Outside the Earth (1871) was an early, 19th century example of interest in the subject of life on Mars.

== Selected works ==
- Scoriæ: Eulogy on Shakespeare (1864)
- Astronomy Without a Telescope (1869)
- Chicago and the Great Conflagration (1871)
- Star Studies: What We Know of the Universe Outside the Earth (1871)
- The Lunar Apsides (1885)
- Washington, Shakespeare and St. George (1893)
- The Earth Measured (1898)

== Bibliography ==
- Library of Congress. (n.d.). "Envisioning Martian Civilizations". Life on Other Worlds. Finding Our Place in the Cosmos: From Galileo to Sagan and Beyond. Retrieved August 23, 2023.
- Taylor, Charles H. (February 1922). "A Memorial to Elias Colbert". Popular Astronomy. Goodsell Observatory of Carleton College. 30 (2).
