= Louise Woodworth Foss =

American actress

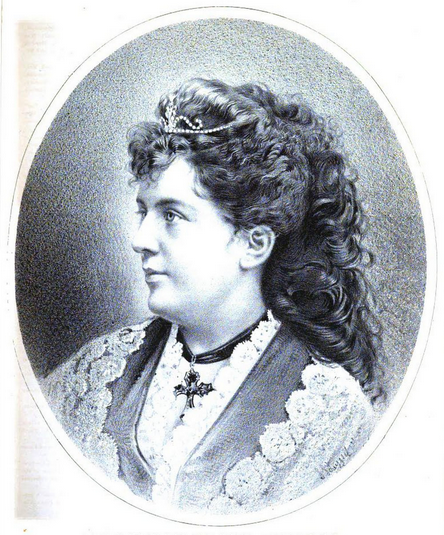
Louise Woodworth Foss (1873)

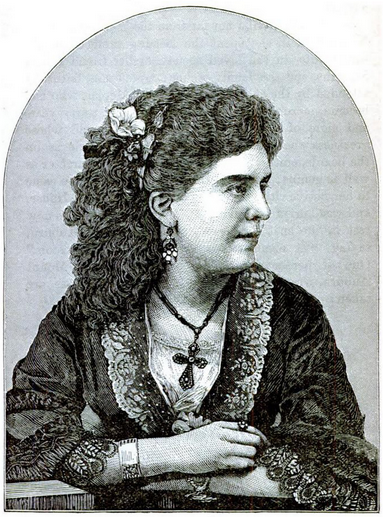
Louise Woodworth Foss (1883)

Louisa Woodworth Sanborn Foss (April 19, 1841 in Thetford, Vermont – September 22, 1892 in Malden, Massachusetts) was regarded as the best American elocutionist in her day. Compared to Charlotte Cushman, Foss was counted among the first woman elocutionists in the world.

== Biography ==
Louisa Sanborn was a native of Thetford, Vermont. She was educated at Thetford Academy, Vermont.

She became a teacher and subsequently married Eliphalet J. Foss, the Boston photographer. After a few years of home life, she adopted the profession of an elocutionist, studying with Richard Reeve Baxter of Harvard College. Her local reputation as a reader was long known to the literary circles of Boston, where she was affiliated with the Boston Academy of Elocution and Dramatic Arts. By 1883, she had been before the public for five successive seasons, her engagements extending through the principal cities of twenty-two States, and extending from the east coast to the west.
