= James Simms (instrument maker) =

James Simms (1828 – 4 September 1915) was an English instrument maker.

He succeeded his father William Simms (1793 – 1860) at the instrument making firm Troughton & Simms. The firm made instruments of various kinds, including notably astronomical instruments and telescopes.

For about ten years, until 1871, his partner in the firm was his cousin William Simms (1817 – 1907), who was the son of his uncle James, the brother of his father William. After 1871 he was sole proprietor. After his death, he was succeeded in the firm by his sons, who were named William and James.

== See also ==
- List of astronomical instrument makers
