= Abiyun al-Bitriq =

7th-century astronomer

Abiyun al-Bitriq (Arabic: ابيون البطريق, abiyūn al-biṭrīq, fl. 630 CE) was a mathematician and a maker of astronomical instruments at the beginnings of Islam. He is mentioned in al-Qifti's Tarikh al-Hukama as Anibun (أنبون, anibūn), (Note: Ta'rīḫ al-Ḥukamā', أنبون page ٧١ (71) in Lippert's edition (Lippert 1903)) and al-Nadim's Fihrist. (Note: Kitāb al-Fihrist, ابيون البطريق page ٢٧٠ (270) in Flügel's edition (Flügel 1871)) His name is not certain, and it was probably Apion (Ancient Greek: Ἀπίων) or Apion Patrikios (Ancient Greek: Ἀπίων Πατρίκιος). He wrote a book, now lost, titled "On Operating the Planispherical Astrolabe" (Arabic: كتاب العمل بالاسطرلاب المسطح, kitāb al-ʿamal bi-l-asṭurlāb al-musaṭṭaḥ)

== Bibliography ==
- Bladel, Kevin van (2008). "Abiyūn al-biṭrīq". In Keyser, Paul T.; Irby-Massie, Georgia L. (eds.). The encyclopedia of ancient natural scientists the Greek tradition and its many heirs. London: Routledge. p. 30. ISBN 978-0-203-46273-7.
- Flügel, Gustav, ed. (1871). Kitâb al-Fihrist; Mit anmerkungen herausgegeben (in German and Arabic). Vol. 1. Leipzig: Berlag von F.C.W. Vogel.
- Lippert, Julius, ed. (1903). Ibn al-Qifṭī's Ta'rīḫ al-Ḥukamā' (in German and Arabic). Leipzig: Dieterichsche Verlagsbuchhandlung.
- Sezgin, Fuat (1978). Geschichte des arabischen Schrifttums (in German). Vol. 6. Leiden: Brill. p. 103. ISBN 90-04-05878-8.
