= Dearborn Observatory =

Astronomical observatory in Evanston, Illinois

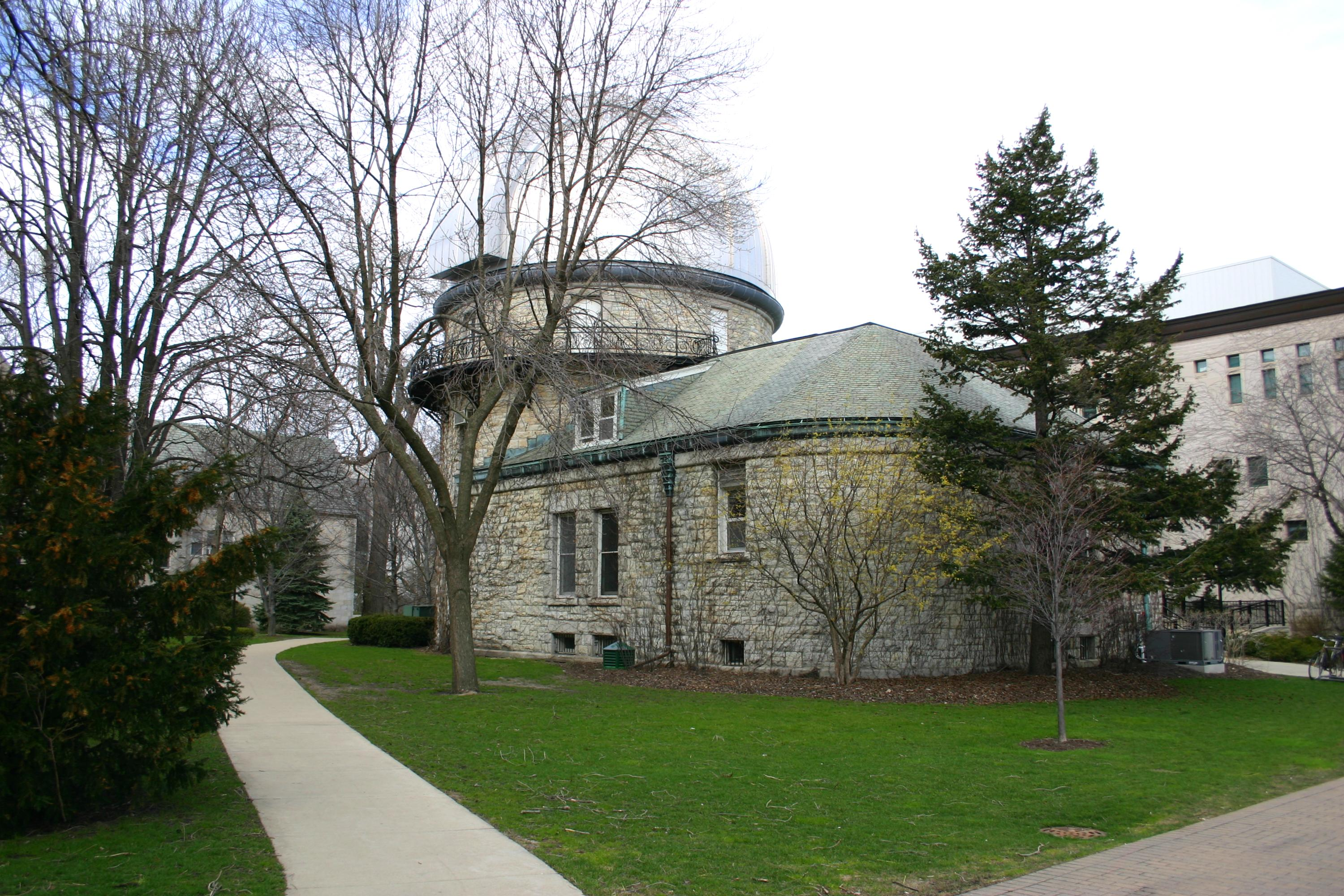
- The Dearborn Observatory in 2007
- Alternative names: 2131 Tech Drive
- Named after: Mary Ann Haven Dearborn
- Organization: Northwestern University
- Observatory code: 756
- Location: Evanston, Illinois, U.S.A.
- Coordinates: 42°03.4′N 87°40.5′W
- Altitude: 195 m (640 ft)
- Established: 1889 (first founding 1862)

Telescopes
- Dearborn Telescope: 469.9 millimetres (18.50 in) refractor

The Dearborn Observatory is an astronomical observatory located on the Evanston campus of Northwestern University. The observatory was originally constructed in 1888, through an agreement between the university and the Chicago Astronomical Society. In the summer of 1939, Dearborn Observatory had to be moved to make way for the construction of the Technological Institute.

The 1888 observatory is the second Dearborn Observatory, the first had been erected on the Old University of Chicago campus.

The observatory is home to the Dearborn 18 1/2 inch refractor, which was the largest telescope in the United States in the late 1860s. Due to the complicated history, it was operated from a different site at that time, and the original tube and mounting is at the Adler Planetarium since 1929. The 18 1/2 was used to discover Sirius B, a companion to the brightest star in the night sky.

== Summary ==
The telescope was established at Douglass Park in a 90 foot tall dome of the old University of Chicago. It was operated by the old University until about 1886 when ownership passed to the Chicago Astronomical Society in 1887. It was moved to Northwestern University at Evanston by 1889. CAS still supported operations of the observatory jointly with a university benefactor at the new location. The Chicago Astronomical Society did not transfer ownership to Northwestern University until 1929, however.

In 1911 the original tube and mounting were replaced, and eventually donated to Adler Planetarium in 1929 by the Chicago Astronomical Society.

The early records of the telescope before 1871 are more limited because documents were destroyed in the Chicago Fire of 1871.

The telescope was surpassed by the 26-inch (66 cm) Great Refractor installed at the United States Naval Observatory in 1873, then located at Foggy Bottom.

== History ==
The history of the Dearborn Observatory coincides with the founding of the Chicago Astronomical Society in 1862. The society heard of the 1861 construction of a 469.9 millimetres (18.50 in) lens for a telescope, which made it, at the time, the largest refracting telescope in the world. The lens had been commissioned by Frederick Augustus Porter Barnard, the chancellor of the University of Mississippi, and later president of Columbia University, who hoped to found an observatory with the new lens. He commissioned the renowned firm of Alvan Clark & Sons of Cambridge, Massachusetts, to construct the lens. However, the American Civil War began before the lens could be delivered to Mississippi. The lens therefore remained in the Clark's shop in Cambridge, where it was eventually put up for sale.

The lens was initially intended for Harvard University, but was bought instead by Chicagoan Thomas Hoyne, a founding member of the Chicago Astronomical Society, for the sum of $11,187. The Chicago Astronomical Society intended the lens for the Old University of Chicago (a precursor to the current University of Chicago) and a tower was constructed on Cottage Grove Avenue around the lens. The structure was named the "Dearborn Observatory" in honor of Mary Ann Haven Dearborn, the deceased wife of J. Young Scammon, principal benefactor of the project. Construction of the observatory began in 1863, and the original Dearborn Observatory was completed two years later. The Observatory was managed by the Old University of Chicago for many years, however financial struggle caused it to declare bankruptcy in 1881, and the Chicago Astronomical Society had to do battle in the courts to successfully establish their title to the Dearborn instruments & library.

In 1887, the Chicago Astronomical Society signed a deal with Northwestern University to bring the telescope to Evanston, and a new observatory was built on the Evanston campus to house the telescope. Funding for the project was provided by Astronomical Society member and Northwestern Trustee James B. Hobbs. The new observatory was designed by architectural firm Cobb and Frost and constructed of limestone in the Richardsonian Romanesque style. The cornerstone for the building was laid on June 21, 1888, and the dedication took place on June 19, 1889. The first director of the observatory at Northwestern was astronomer George Washington Hough.

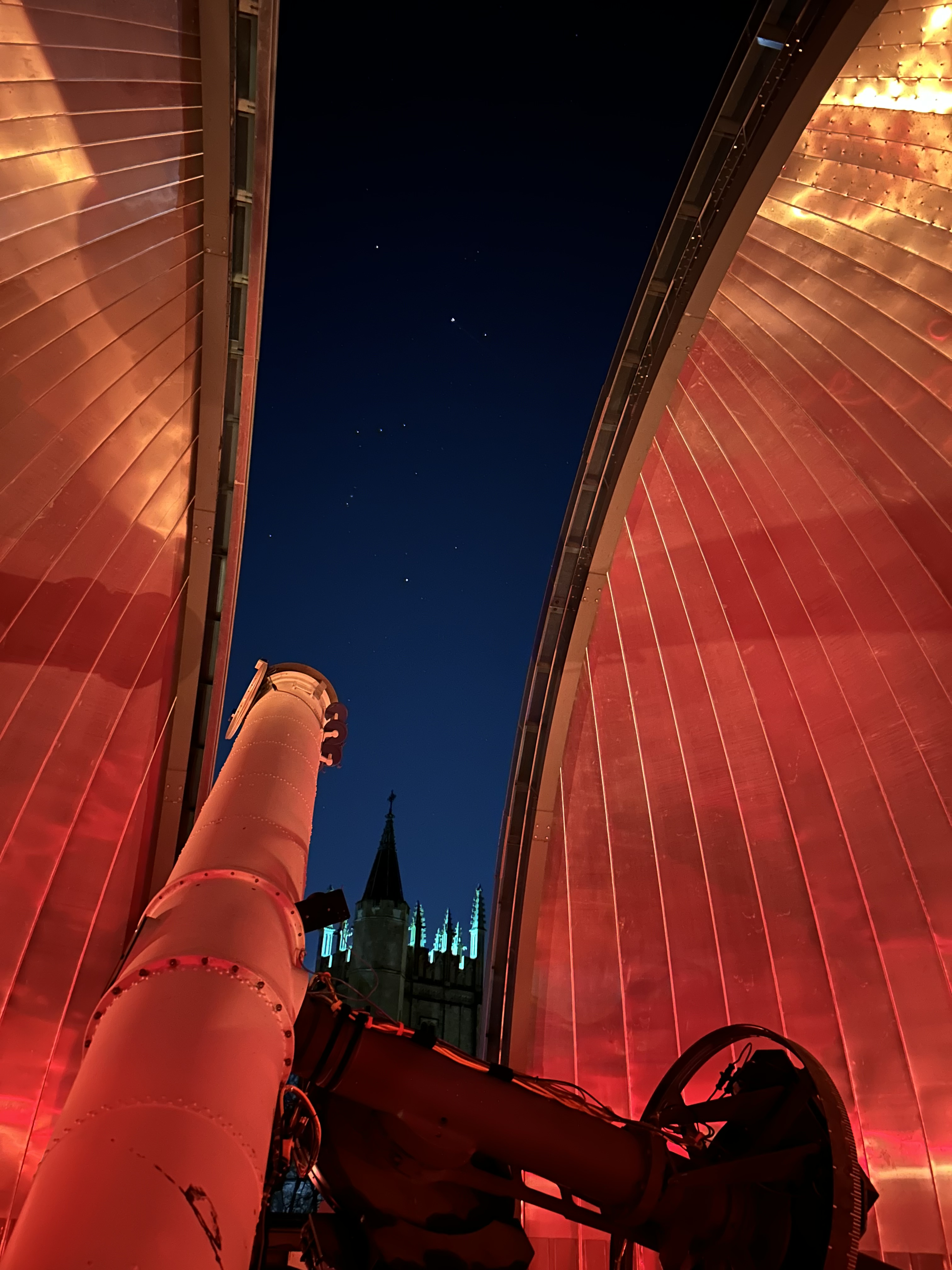
A photo of the Dearborn Telescope pointed at the Orion Nebula

The close affiliation between Dearborn Observatory and the Chicago Astronomical Society continued until, following the Wall Street crash of 1929, the Society encountered financial hardship and found it too expensive to maintain the observatory and its equipment. On April 30, 1930, the Chicago Astronomical Society formally relinquished its title to the observatory to Northwestern University, on the condition that the Observatory be open to the public without cost. In 1911, Northwestern decided that the lens needed a more modern mounting, and the original tube and mount were removed. In 1929, these pieces were placed on permanent loan to the new Adler Planetarium, and installed on the planetarium's exhibit floor. The 470 millimetres (19 in) lens has remained at Northwestern. In the summer of 1939, the Dearborn Observatory building had to be moved 200 metres (660 ft) southeast to its present location to make way for the construction of the Technological Institute. The latest addition to the observatory was an 11.6 metres (38 ft) aluminum dome, added in 1997. The observatory underwent extensive renovations to both the interior and exterior in the summer of 2015.

Northwestern University's astronomy department resided in the offices of Dearborn until 2013, when most of the department moved into a newly renovated wing of the Technological Institute. The telescope is still used by astronomy classes and is open to the public every Friday night. The director of Dearborn Observatory is Professor Michael Smutko.

== Sirius B discovery ==
On January 31, 1862, American telescope-maker and astronomer Alvan Graham Clark first observed the faint companion, which is now called Sirius B, or affectionately "the Pup". This happened during testing of an 18.5-inch (470 mm) aperture great refractor telescope for Dearborn Observatory, which was one of the largest refracting telescope lens in existence at the time, and the largest telescope in the United States. Sirius B's sighting was confirmed on March 8, 1862, with smaller telescopes.

== Timeline ==
- 1862: Clark discovers Sirius B, splitting the brightest star in the sky with brand new 18 1/2 inch refractor
- 1864–1886: Used at Douglass Park in Chicago, Illinois.
- 1889: The 18 1/2 is moved to Evanston, Illinois
- 1911: The objective is moved to a new mounting and tube (old tube and mount saved)

== See also ==
- Corralitos Observatory
- Elias Colbert
- Lindheimer Astrophysical Research Center
- List of largest optical refracting telescopes
- List of the largest optical telescopes in North America § Biggest telescopes in 1900
