= Vilém Gajdušek =

Czech optician and telescope designer

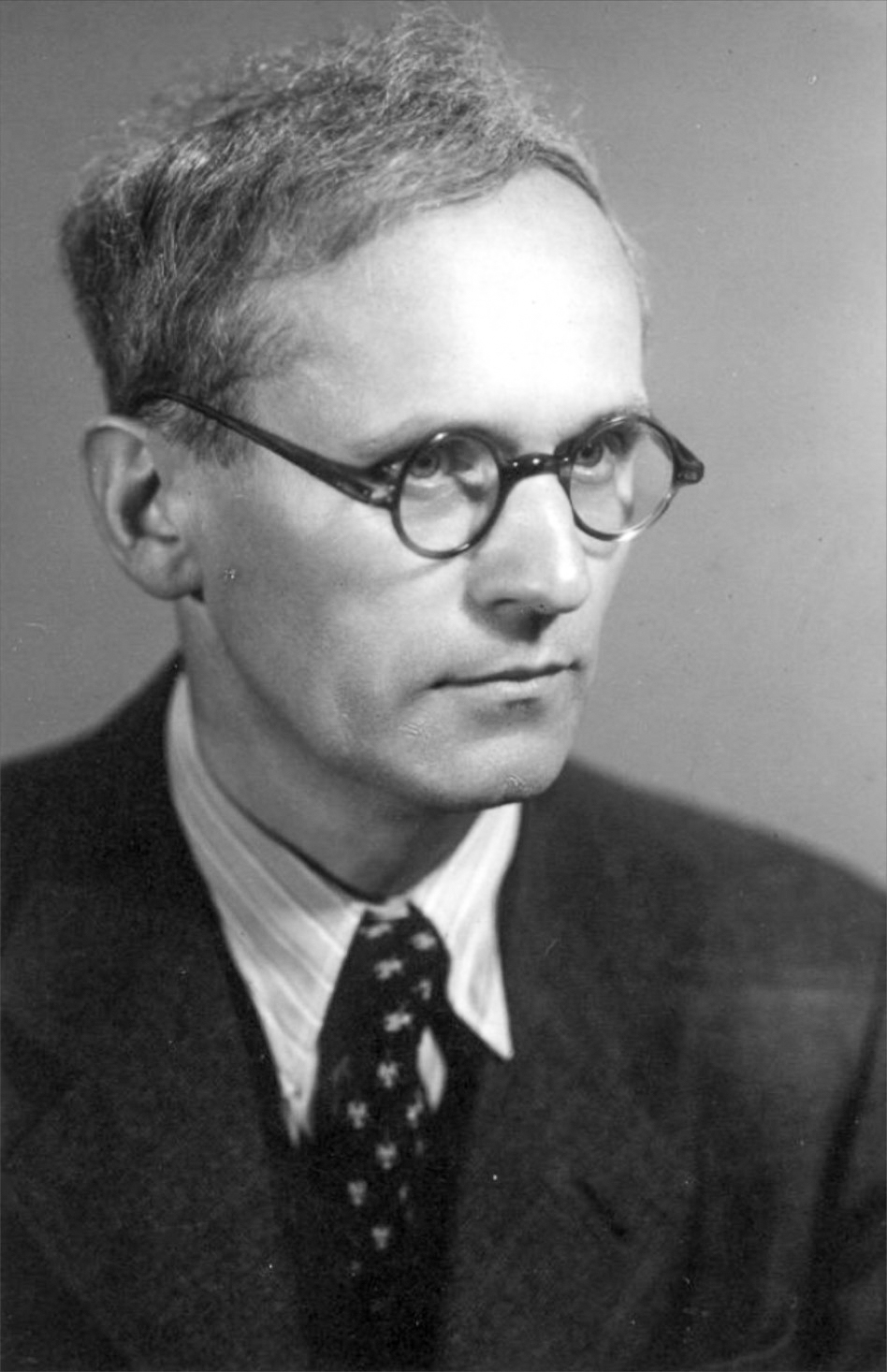
Vilém Gajdušek

Vilém Gajdušek (1895–1977) was a Czech optician and prominent telescope designer.

Asteroid 3603 Gajdušek is named for him.

== See also ==
- List of astronomical instrument makers
