= Alvan Graham Clark =

19th-century American astronomer

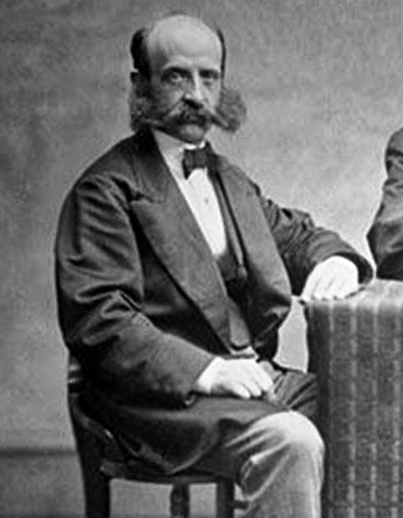
- Clark in c. 1870
- Born: July 10, 1832; Fall River, Massachusetts
- Died: June 9, 1897 (aged 65); Cambridge, Massachusetts
- Known for: Sirius B
- Awards: Lalande Prize (1862)
- Scientific career
- Fields: Astronomy

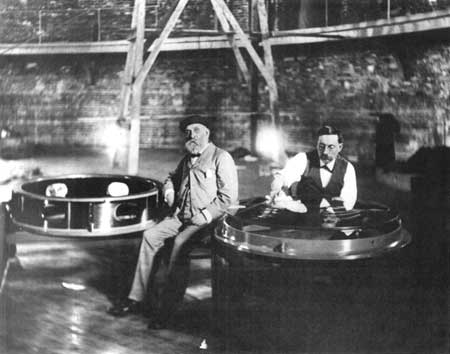
Alvan Clark and his assistant Carl Lundin (right) alongside the 40-inch lens, 1896

Alvan Graham Clark (July 10, 1832 – June 9, 1897) was an American astronomer and telescope-maker.

== Biography ==
Alvan Graham Clark was born in Fall River, Massachusetts, the son of Alvan Clark, founder of Alvan Clark & Sons.

On January 31, 1862, while testing a new 18.5-inch (470 mm) aperture great refractor telescope in Cambridgeport, Massachusetts, Clark made the first ever observation of a white dwarf star. This discovery of Sirius B, or affectionately "the Pup", proved an earlier hypotheses (Friedrich Wilhelm Bessel in 1844) that Sirius, the brightest star in the night sky with an apparent magnitude of −1.46, had an unseen companion disturbing its motion. Clark used the largest refracting telescope lens in existence at the time, and the largest telescope in the United States, to observe the magnitude 8 companion.

Clark's 18.5 inch refracting telescope was then delivered to his customer, the landmark Dearborn Observatory of Northwestern University in Evanston, Illinois, where it is still being used today.

Alvan Graham Clark died in Cambridge, Massachusetts on June 9, 1897.

== See also ==
- List of astronomical instrument makers
