= Timeline of telescope technology =

The following timeline lists the significant events in the invention and development of the telescope.

== BC ==
=== 2560 BC to 1 BC ===
- c.2560 BC–c.860 BC — Egyptian artisans polish rock crystal, semi-precious stones, and latterly glass to produce facsimile eyes for statuary and mummy cases. The intent appears to be to produce an optical illusion.
- 424 BC Aristophanes "lens" is a glass globe filled with water.(Seneca says that it can be used to read letters no matter how small or dim)
- 3rd century BC Euclid is the first to study reflection and refraction using mathematical theorems based on the fact that light travels in straight lines

== AD ==
=== 1 AD to 999 AD ===
- 2nd century AD — Ptolemy (in his work Optics) wrote about the properties of light including: reflection, refraction, and colour.
- 984 — Ibn Sahl completes a treatise On Burning Mirrors and Lenses, describing plano-convex and biconvex lenses, and parabolic and ellipsoidal mirrors.

=== 1000 AD to 1999 AD ===
- 1011–1021 — Ibn al-Haytham (also known as Alhacen or Alhazen) writes the Kitab al-Manazir (Book of Optics)
- 1230–1235 — Robert Grosseteste describes the use of 'optics' to "...make small things placed at a distance appear any size we want, so that it may be possible for us to read the smallest letters at incredible distances..." ("Haec namque pars Perspectivae perfecte cognita ostendit nobis modum, quo res longissime distantes faciamus apparere propinquissime positas et quo res magnas propinquas faciamus apparere brevissimas et quo res longe positas parvas faciamus apparere quantum volumus magnas, ita ut possible sit nobis ex incredibili distantia litteras minimas legere, aut arenam, aut granum, aut gramina, aut quaevis minuta numerare.") in his work De Iride.
- 1266 — Roger Bacon mentions the magnifying properties of transparent objects in his treatise Opus Majus.
- 1270 (approx) — Witelo writes Perspectiva — "Optics" incorporating much of Kitab al-Manazir.
- 1285–1300 spectacles are invented.
- 1570 — The writings of Thomas Digges describes how his father, English mathematician and surveyor Leonard Digges (1520–1559), made use of a "proportional Glass" to view distant objects and people. Some, such as the historian Colin Ronan, claim this describes a reflecting or refracting telescope built between 1540 and 1559 but its vague description and claimed performance makes it dubious.
- 1586 Giambattista della Porta writes "...to make glasses that can recognize a man several miles away" It is unclear whether he is describing a telescope or corrective glasses.
- 1608 — Hans Lippershey, a Dutch lensmaker, applies for a patent for a perspective glass "for seeing things far away as if they were nearby", the first recorded design for what will later be called a telescope. His patent beats fellow Dutch instrument-maker's Jacob Metius's patent by a few weeks. A claim will be made 37 years later by another Dutch spectacle-maker that his father, Zacharias Janssen, invented the telescope.

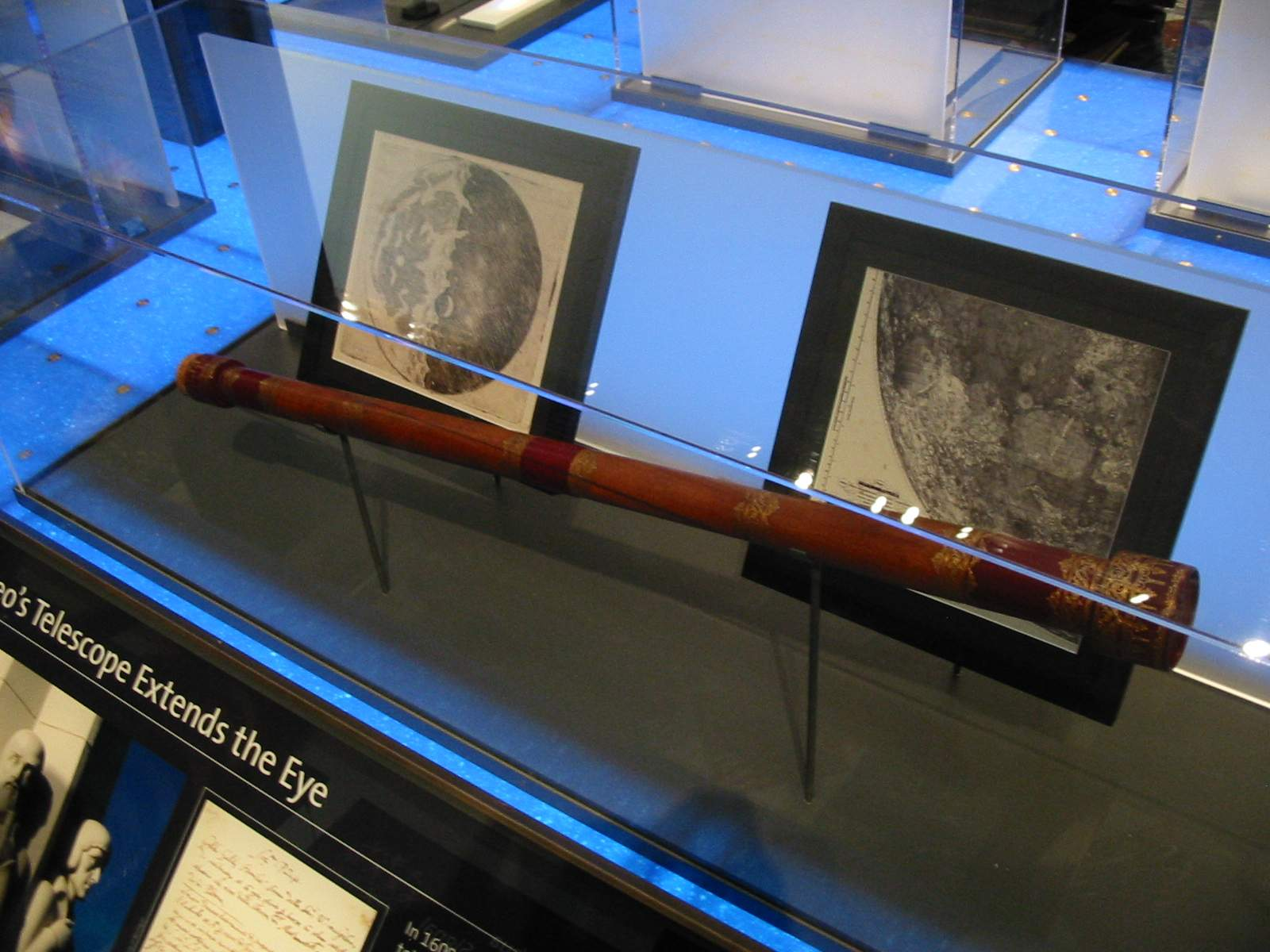
A replica of Galileo's telescope

- 1609 — Galileo Galilei makes his own improved version of Lippershey's telescope, calling it a "perspicillum".
- 1611 — Greek mathematician Giovanni Demisiani coins the word "telescope" (from the Greek τῆλε, tele "far" and σκοπεῖν, skopein "to look or see"; τηλεσκόπος, teleskopos "far-seeing") for one of Galileo Galilei's instruments presented at a banquet at the Accademia dei Lincei.
- 1611 — Johannes Kepler describes the optics of lenses (see his books Astronomiae Pars Optica and Dioptrice), including a new kind of astronomical telescope with two convex lenses (the 'Keplerian' telescope).
- 1616 — Niccolo Zucchi claims at this time he experimented with a concave bronze mirror, attempting to make a reflecting telescope.
- 1630 — Christoph Scheiner constructs a telescope to Kepler's design.
- 1650 — Christiaan Huygens produces his design for a compound eyepiece.
- 1663 — Scottish mathematician James Gregory designs a reflecting telescope with paraboloid primary mirror and ellipsoid secondary mirror. Construction techniques at the time could not make it, and a workable model was not produced until 10 years later by Robert Hooke. The design is known as 'Gregorian'.

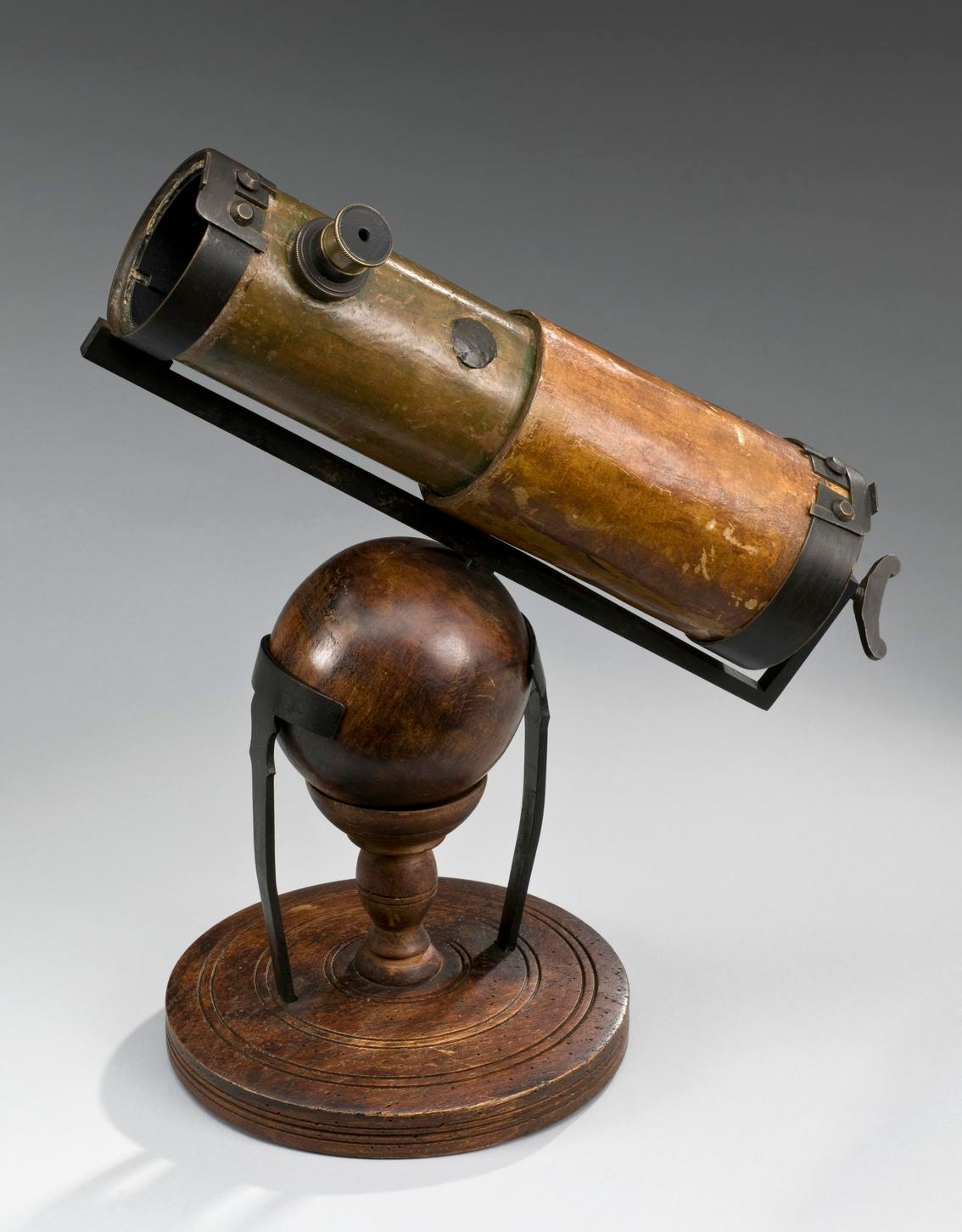
A replica of a second reflecting telescope Newton presented to the Royal Society in 1672 (the first one he made in 1668 was loaned to an instrument maker but there is no further record of what happened to it).

- 1668 — Isaac Newton produces the first functioning reflecting telescope using a spherical primary mirror and a flat diagonal secondary mirror. This design is termed the 'Newtonian'.
- 1672 — Laurent Cassegrain, produces a design for a reflecting telescope using a paraboloid primary mirror and a hyperboloid secondary mirror. The design, named 'Cassegrain', is still used in astronomical telescopes used in observatories in 2006.
- 1674 — Robert Hooke produces a reflecting telescope based on the Gregorian design.
- 1684 — Christiaan Huygens publishes "Astroscopia Compendiaria" in which he described the design of very long aerial telescopes.
- 1720 — John Hadley develops ways of aspherizing spherical mirrors to make very accurate parabolic mirrors and produces a much improved Gregorian telescope
- 1721 — John Hadley experiments with the neglected Newtonian telescope design and demonstrates one with a 6-inch parabolic mirror to the Royal Society.
- 1730s — James Short succeeds in producing a Gregorian telescopes to true paraboloidal primary and ellipsoidal secondary design specifications.
- 1733 — Chester Moore Hall invents the achromatic lens.
- 1758 — John Dollond re-invents and patents the achromatic lens.
- 1783 — Jesse Ramsden invents his eponymous eyepiece.
- 1803 — The "Observatorio Astronómico Nacional de Colombia (OAN)" is inaugurated as the first observatory in the Americas in Bogotá, Colombia.
- 1849 — Carl Kellner designs and manufactures the first achromatic eyepiece, announced in his paper "Das orthoskopische Ocular".
- 1857 — Léon Foucault improves reflecting telescopes when he introduced a process of depositing a layer of silver on glass telescope mirrors.
- 1860 — Georg Simon Plössl produces his eponymous eyepiece.
- 1880 — Ernst Abbe designs the first orthoscopic eyepiece (Kellner's was solely achromatic rather than orthoscopic, despite his description).
- 1897 — Largest practical refracting telescope, the Yerkes Observatorys' 40 inch (101.6 cm) refractor, is built.
- 1900 — The largest refractor ever, Great Paris Exhibition Telescope of 1900 with an objective of 49.2 inch (1.25 m) diameter is temporarily exhibited at the Paris 1900 Exposition.
- 1910s — George Willis Ritchey and Henri Chrétien co-invent the Ritchey-Chrétien telescope used in many, if not most of the largest astronomical telescopes.
- 1930 — Bernhard Schmidt invents the Schmidt camera.
- 1932 — John Donovan Strong first “aluminizes" a telescope mirror a much longer lasting aluminium coating using thermal vacuum evaporation.
- 1944 — Dmitri Dmitrievich Maksutov invents the Maksutov telescope.
- 1967 — The first neutrino telescope opened in Africa.
- 1970 — The first space observatory, Uhuru, is launched, being also the first gamma-ray telescope.
- 1975 — BTA-6 is the first major telescope to use an altazimuth mount, which is mechanically simpler but requires computer control for accurate pointing.

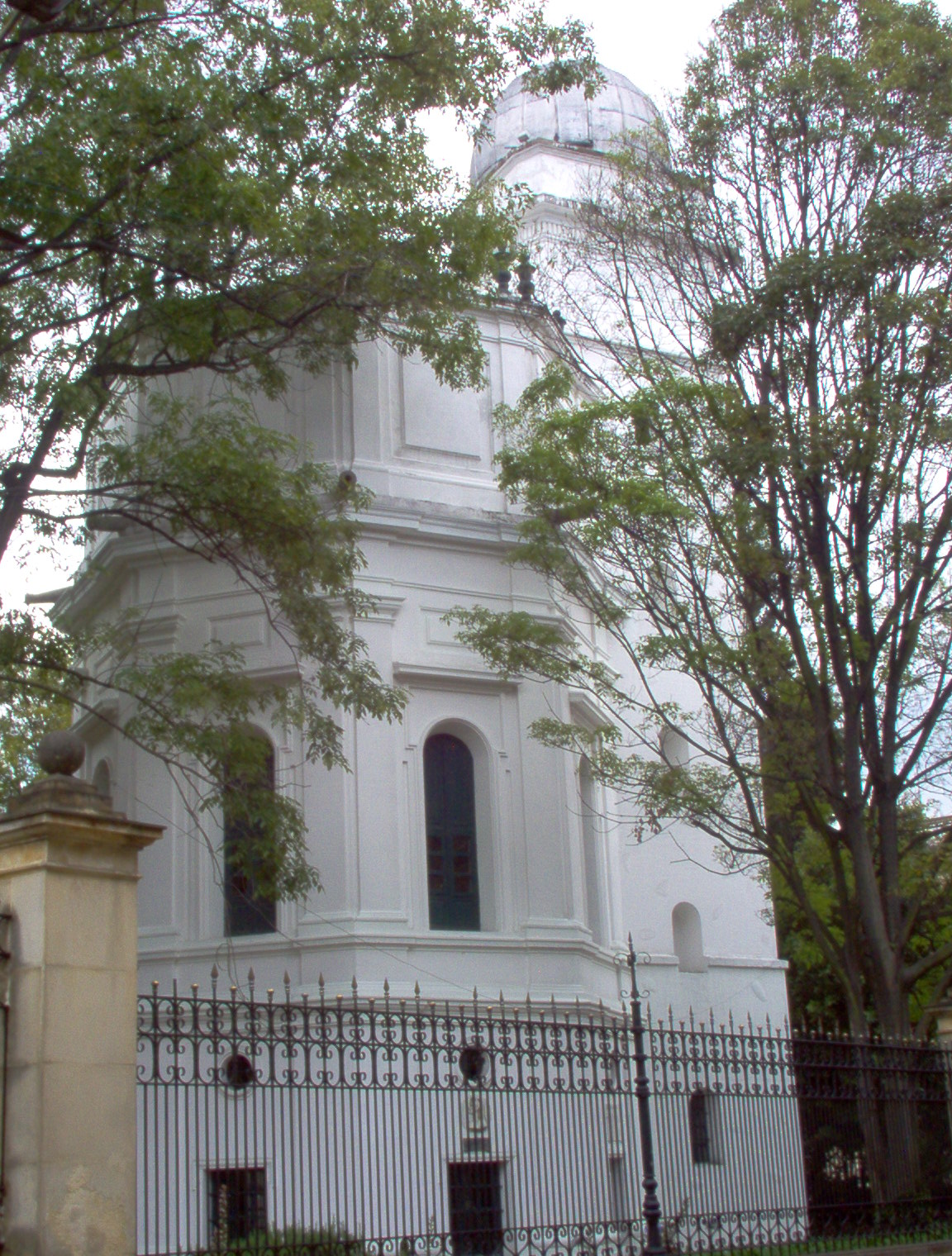
The Oldest Observatory in the Americas is found in Bogotá, Colombia (1803).

- 1990 — Hubble Space Telescope (HST) was launched into low Earth orbit

=== 2000 CE to 2025 CE ===
- 2003 — The Spitzer Space Telescope (SST), formerly the Space Infrared Telescope Facility (SIRTF), is an infrared space observatory launched in 2003. It is the fourth and final of the NASA Great Observatories program
- 2008 — Max Tegmark and Matias Zaldarriaga created the Fast Fourier Transform Telescope.
- 2022 — The James Webb Space Telescope is launched by NASA.

== See also ==
- Catadioptric telescope
- Eyepiece
- History of telescopes
- List of largest optical telescopes historically
- NASA
- Reflecting telescope
- Refracting telescope
- Timeline of telescopes, observatories, and observing technology
