= History of the telescope =

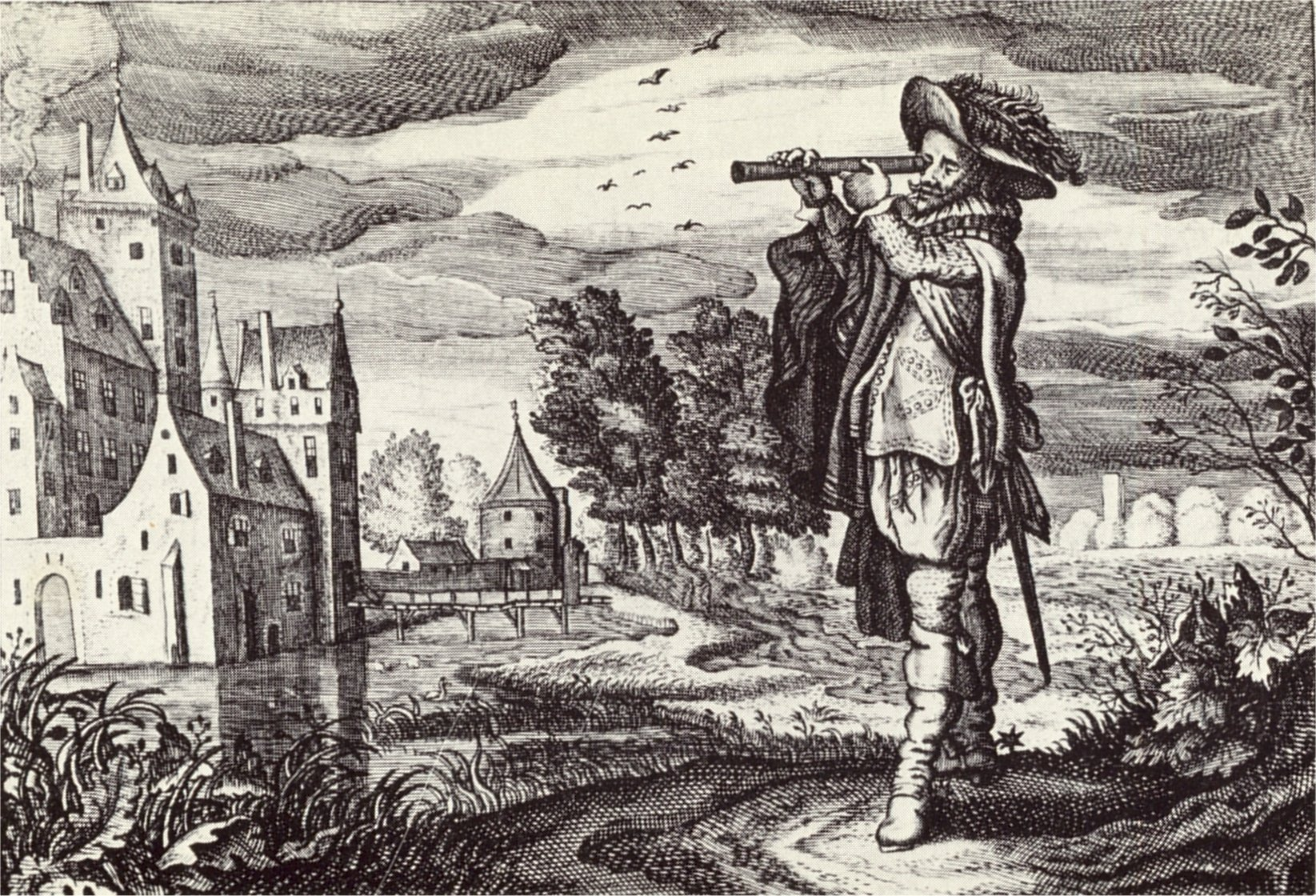
Early depiction of a "Dutch telescope" from 1624.

The history of the telescope can be traced to before the invention of the earliest known telescope, which appeared in 1608 in the Netherlands, when a patent was submitted by Hans Lippershey, an eyeglass maker. Although Lippershey did not receive his patent, news of the invention soon spread across Europe. The design of these early refracting telescopes consisted of a convex objective lens and a concave eyepiece. Galileo improved on this design the following year and applied it to astronomy. In 1611, Johannes Kepler described how a far more useful telescope could be made with a convex objective lens and a convex eyepiece lens. By 1655, astronomers such as Christiaan Huygens were building powerful but unwieldy Keplerian telescopes with compound eyepieces.

Isaac Newton is credited with building the first reflector in 1668 with a design that incorporated a small flat diagonal mirror to reflect the light to an eyepiece mounted on the side of the telescope. Laurent Cassegrain in 1672 described the design of a reflector with a small convex secondary mirror to reflect light through a central hole in the main mirror.

The achromatic lens, which greatly reduced chromatic aberrations in objective lenses and allowed for shorter and more functional telescopes, first appeared in a 1733 telescope made by Chester Moore Hall, who did not publicize it. John Dollond learned of Hall's invention and began producing telescopes using it in commercial quantities, starting in 1758.

Important developments in reflecting telescopes were John Hadley's production of larger paraboloidal mirrors in 1721; the process of silvering glass mirrors introduced by Léon Foucault in 1857; and the adoption of long-lasting aluminized coatings on reflector mirrors in 1932. The Ritchey-Chretien variant of Cassegrain reflector was invented around 1910, but not widely adopted until after 1950; many modern telescopes including the Hubble Space Telescope use this design, which gives a wider field of view than a classic Cassegrain.

During the period 1850–1900, reflectors suffered from problems with speculum metal mirrors, and a considerable number of "Great Refractors" were built from 60 cm to 1 metre aperture, culminating in the Yerkes Observatory refractor in 1897; however, starting from the early 1900s a series of ever-larger reflectors with glass mirrors were built, including the Mount Wilson 60-inch (1.5 metre), the 100-inch (2.5 metre) Hooker Telescope (1917) and the 200-inch (5 metre) Hale Telescope (1948); essentially all major research telescopes since 1900 have been reflectors. A number of 4-metre class (160 inch) telescopes were built on superior higher altitude sites including Hawaii and the Chilean desert in the 1975–1985 era. The development of the computer-controlled alt-azimuth mount in the 1970s and active optics in the 1980s enabled a new generation of even larger telescopes, starting with the 10-metre (400 inch) Keck telescopes in 1993/1996, and a number of 8-metre telescopes including the ESO Very Large Telescope, Gemini Observatory and Subaru Telescope.

The era of radio telescopes (along with radio astronomy) was born with Karl Guthe Jansky's serendipitous discovery of an astronomical radio source in 1931. Many types of telescopes were developed in the 20th century for a wide range of wavelengths from radio to gamma-rays. The development of space observatories after 1960 allowed access to several bands impossible to observe from the ground, including X-rays and longer wavelength infrared bands.

== Optical telescopes ==
=== Optical foundations ===
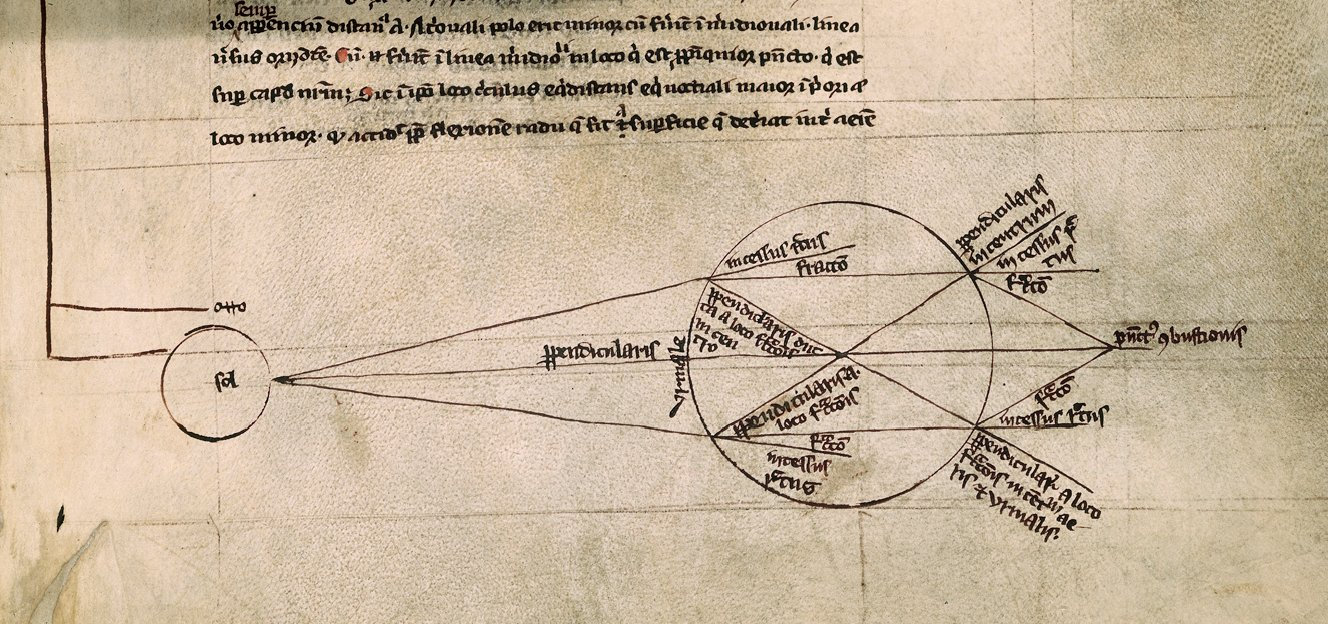
Optical diagram showing light being refracted by a spherical glass container full of water, from Roger Bacon, De multiplicatione specierum

Objects resembling lenses date back 4000 years although it is unknown if they were used for their optical properties or just as decoration. Greek accounts of the optical properties of water-filled spheres (5th century BC) were followed by many centuries of writings on optics, including Ptolemy (2nd century) in his Optics, who wrote about the properties of light including reflection, refraction, and color, followed by Ibn Sahl (10th century) and Ibn Al-Haytham (11th century).

Actual use of lenses dates back to the widespread manufacture and use of eyeglasses in Northern Italy beginning in the late 13th century. The invention of the use of concave lenses to correct near-sightedness is ascribed to Nicholas of Cusa in 1451.

=== Invention ===
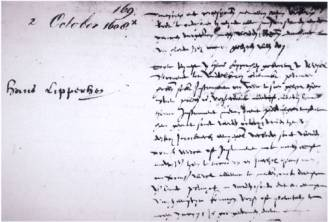
Notes on Hans Lippershey's unsuccessful telescope patent in 1608

The first record of a telescope comes from the Netherlands in 1608. It is in a patent filed by Middelburg spectacle-maker Hans Lippershey with the States General of the Netherlands on 2 October 1608 for his instrument "for seeing things far away as if they were nearby." A few weeks later another Dutch instrument-maker, Jacob Metius also applied for a patent. The States General did not award a patent since the knowledge of the device already seemed to be ubiquitous but the Dutch government awarded Lippershey with a contract for copies of his design.

The original Dutch telescopes were composed of a convex and a concave lens—telescopes that are constructed this way do not invert the image. Lippershey's original design had only 3x magnification. Telescopes seem to have been made in the Netherlands in considerable numbers soon after this date of "invention", and rapidly found their way all over Europe.

==== Claims of prior invention ====
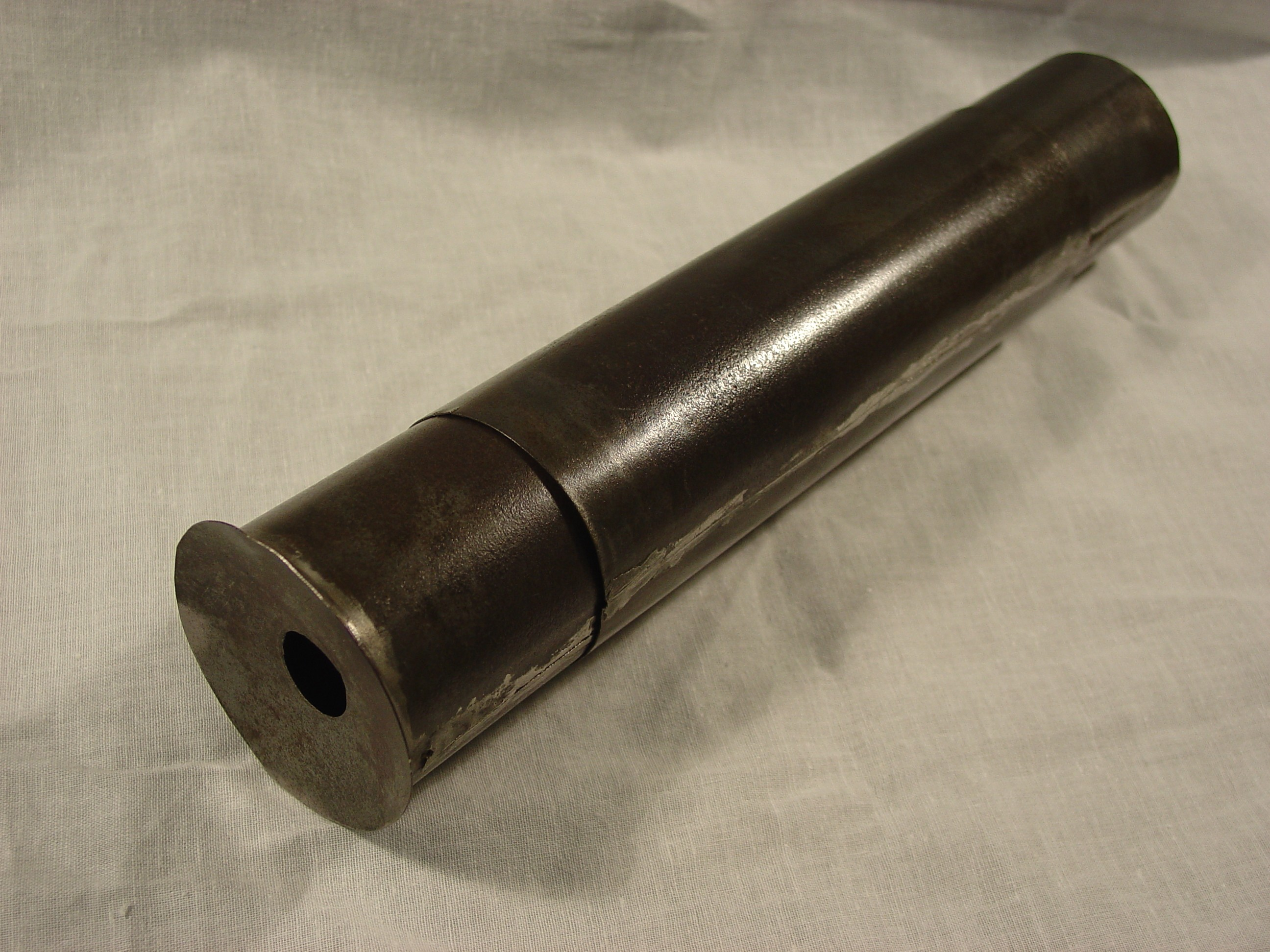
Reproduction of one of the four optical devices that Zacharias Snijder in 1841 claimed were early telescopes built by Zacharias Janssen. Its actual function and creator has been disputed over the years.

In 1655, the Dutch diplomat William de Boreel tried to solve the mystery of who invented the telescope. He had a local magistrate in Middelburg follow-up on Boreel's childhood and early adult recollections of a spectacle-maker named "Hans", who he remembered as the inventor of the telescope. The magistrate was contacted by a then-unknown claimant– the Middelburg spectacle-maker Johannes Zachariassen, who testified that his father– Zacharias Janssen, invented the telescope and the microscope as early as 1590. This testimony seemed convincing to Boreel, who now recollected that Zacharias and his father– Hans Martens, must have been who he remembered. Boreel's conclusion that Zacharias Janssen invented the telescope a little ahead of another spectacle maker, Hans Lippershey, was adopted by Pierre Borel in his 1656 book De vero telescopii inventore. Discrepancies in Boreel's investigation and Zachariassen's testimony (including Zachariassen misrepresenting his date of birth and role in the invention) has led some historians to consider this claim dubious. The "Janssen" claim would continue over the years and be added on to with Zacharias Snijder in 1841 presenting 4 iron tubes with lenses in them claimed to be 1590 examples of Janssen's telescope and historian Cornelis de Waard's 1906 claim that the man who tried to sell a broken telescope to astronomer Simon Marius at the 1608 Frankfurt Book Fair must have been Janssen.

In 1682, the minutes of the Royal Society in London Robert Hooke noted Thomas Digges' 1571 Pantometria, (a book on measurement, partially based on his father Leonard Digges' notes and observations) seemed to support an English claim to the invention of the telescope, describing Leonard as having a fare seeing glass in the mid-1500s based on an idea by Roger Bacon. Thomas described it as "by proportional Glasses duly situate in convenient angles, not only discovered things far off, read letters, numbered pieces of money with the very coin and superscription thereof, cast by some of his friends of purpose upon downs in open fields, but also seven miles off declared what hath been done at that instant in private places." Comments on the use of proportional or "perspective glass" are also made in the writings of John Dee (1575) and William Bourne (1585). Bourne was asked in 1580 to investigate the Diggs device by Queen Elizabeth I's chief advisor Lord Burghley. Bourne's is the best description of it, and from his writing it seemed to consist of peering into a large curved mirror that reflected the image produced by a large lens. The idea of an "Elizabethan Telescope" has been expanded over the years, including astronomer and historian Colin Ronan concluding in the 1990s that this reflecting/refracting telescope was built by Leonard Digges between 1540 and 1559. This "backwards" reflecting telescope would have been unwieldy; it needed very large mirrors and lens to work; the observer had to stand backwards to look at an upside down view, and Bourne noted that it had a very narrow field of view, making it unsuitable for military purposes. The optical performance required to see the details of coins lying about in fields, or private activities seven miles away, seems to be far beyond the technology of the time, and it may be that the "perspective glass" being described was a far simpler idea, originating with Bacon, of using a single lens held in front of the eye to magnify a distant view.

A 1959 research paper by Simon de Guilleuma claimed that evidence he had uncovered pointed to the French born spectacle maker Juan Roget (died before 1624) as another possible builder of an early telescope that predated Hans Lippershey's patent application.

Leonardo da Vinci's purported "telescope", with the described eyepiece-lens drawn in.

In 2022, the Italian professor of physics Alessandro Bettini published a paper on whether Leonardo da Vinci could have invented a telescope. Building upon 1939 observations by Domenico Argentieri of what look like lenses arranged like a telescope in da Vinci drawings, Bettini superimposed Argentieri's lens arrangement on an adjacent drawing of diverging rays, coming up with an arrangement that also looked like a telescope. Bettini also noted the writings of Italian scholar and professor Girolamo Fracastoro in 1538, about combining lenses in eyeglasses to make the "moon or at another star" "so near that they would appear not higher than the towers".

==== Spread of the invention ====
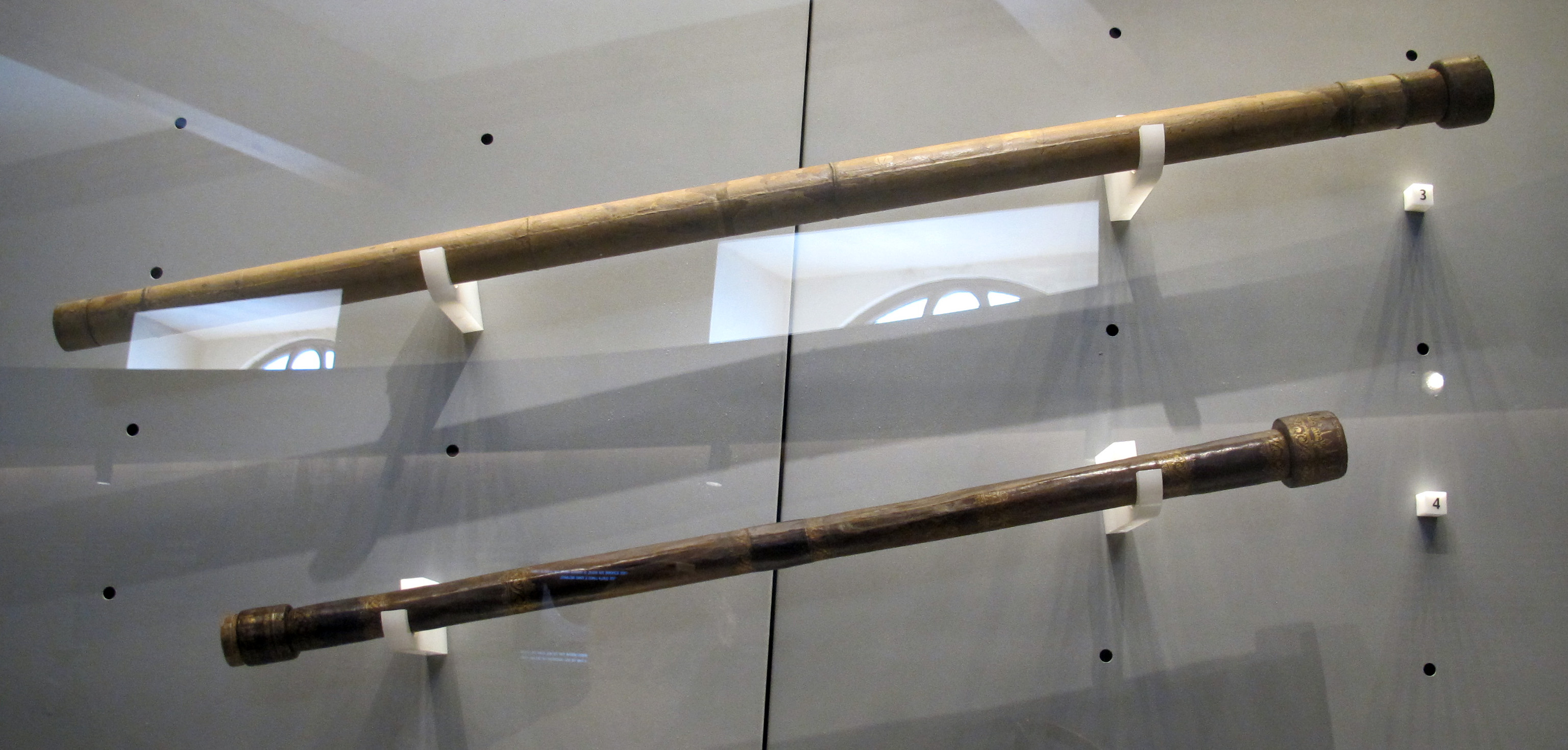
Possibly the oldest surviving telescopes (top: 1610–1630; bottom: 1609–1640), suspected to be "Cannocchiali" refracting telescopes by Galileo Galilei.

Lippershey's application for a patent was mentioned at the end of a diplomatic report on an embassy to Holland from the Kingdom of Siam sent by the Siamese king Ekathotsarot: Ambassades du Roy de Siam envoyé à l'Excellence du Prince Maurice, arrivé à La Haye le 10 Septemb. 1608 (Embassy of the King of Siam sent to his Excellency Prince Maurice, arrived at The Hague on 10 September 1608). This report was issued in October 1608 and distributed across Europe, leading to experiments by other scientists, such as the Italian Paolo Sarpi, who received the report in November, and the English mathematician and astronomer Thomas Harriot, who used a six-powered telescope by the summer of 1609 to observe features on the moon.

The Italian polymath Galileo Galilei was in Venice in June 1609 and there heard of the "Dutch perspective glass", a military spyglass, by means of which distant objects appeared nearer and larger. Galileo states that he solved the problem of the construction of a telescope the first night after his return to Padua from Venice and made his first telescope the next day by using a convex objective lens in one extremity of a leaden tube and a concave eyepiece lens in the other end, an arrangement that came to be called a Galilean telescope. A few days afterwards, having succeeded in making a better telescope than the first, he took it to Venice where he communicated the details of his invention to the public and presented the instrument itself to the doge Leonardo Donato, who was sitting in full council. The senate in return settled him for life in his lectureship at Padua and doubled his salary.

In 1610, Galileo Galilei observed with his telescope that Venus showed phases, despite remaining near the sun in Earth's sky (first image). This proved that Venus orbits the sun and not Earth, as predicted by Copernicus's heliocentric model, and it disproved the then-conventional geocentric model (second image).

Galileo set himself to improving the telescope, producing telescopes of increased magnification. His first telescope had a 3x magnification, but he soon made instruments which magnified 8x, and finally, one nearly a meter long with a 37mm objective (which he would stop down to 16mm or 12mm) and a 23x magnification. With this last instrument, he began a series of astronomical observations in October or November 1609, observing the satellites of Jupiter, hills and valleys on the moon, the phases of Venus and spots on the sun (using the projection method rather than direct observation). Galileo noted that the revolution of the satellites of Jupiter, the phases of Venus, rotation of the sun and the tilted path its spots followed for part of the year pointed to the validity of the sun-centered Copernican system over other Earth-centered systems such as the one proposed by Ptolemy.

Galileo's instrument was the first to be given the name "telescope". The name was invented by the Greek poet/theologian Giovanni Demisiani at a banquet held on April 14, 1611, by Prince Federico Cesi to make Galileo Galilei a member of the Accademia dei Lincei. The word was created from the Greek tele = 'far' and skopein = 'to look or see'; teleskopos = 'far-seeing'.

By 1626 knowledge of the telescope had spread to China when German Jesuit and astronomer Johann Adam Schall von Bell published Yuan jing shuo, (遠鏡說, Explanation of the Telescope) in Chinese and Latin.

=== Further refinements ===
==== Refracting telescopes ====
Johannes Kepler first explained the theory and some of the practical advantages of a telescope constructed of two convex lenses in his Catoptrics (1611). The first person who actually constructed a telescope of this form was the Jesuit Christoph Scheiner who gives a description of it in his Rosa Ursina (1630).

William Gascoigne was the first who commanded a chief advantage of the form of telescope suggested by Kepler: that a small material object could be placed at the common focal plane of the objective and the eyepiece. This led to his invention of the micrometer, and his application of telescopic sights to precision astronomical instruments. It was not until about the middle of the 17th century that Kepler's telescope came into general use: not so much because of the advantages pointed out by Gascoigne, but because its field of view was much larger than in the Galilean telescope.

The first powerful telescopes of Keplerian construction were made by Christiaan Huygens after much labor—in which his brother assisted him. With one of these: an objective diameter of 2.24 inches (57 mm) and a 12 ft (3.7 m) focal length, he discovered the brightest of Saturn's satellites (Titan) in 1655; in 1659, he published his "Systema Saturnium" which, for the first time, gave a true explanation of Saturn's ring—founded on observations made with the same instrument.

===== Long focal length refractors =====
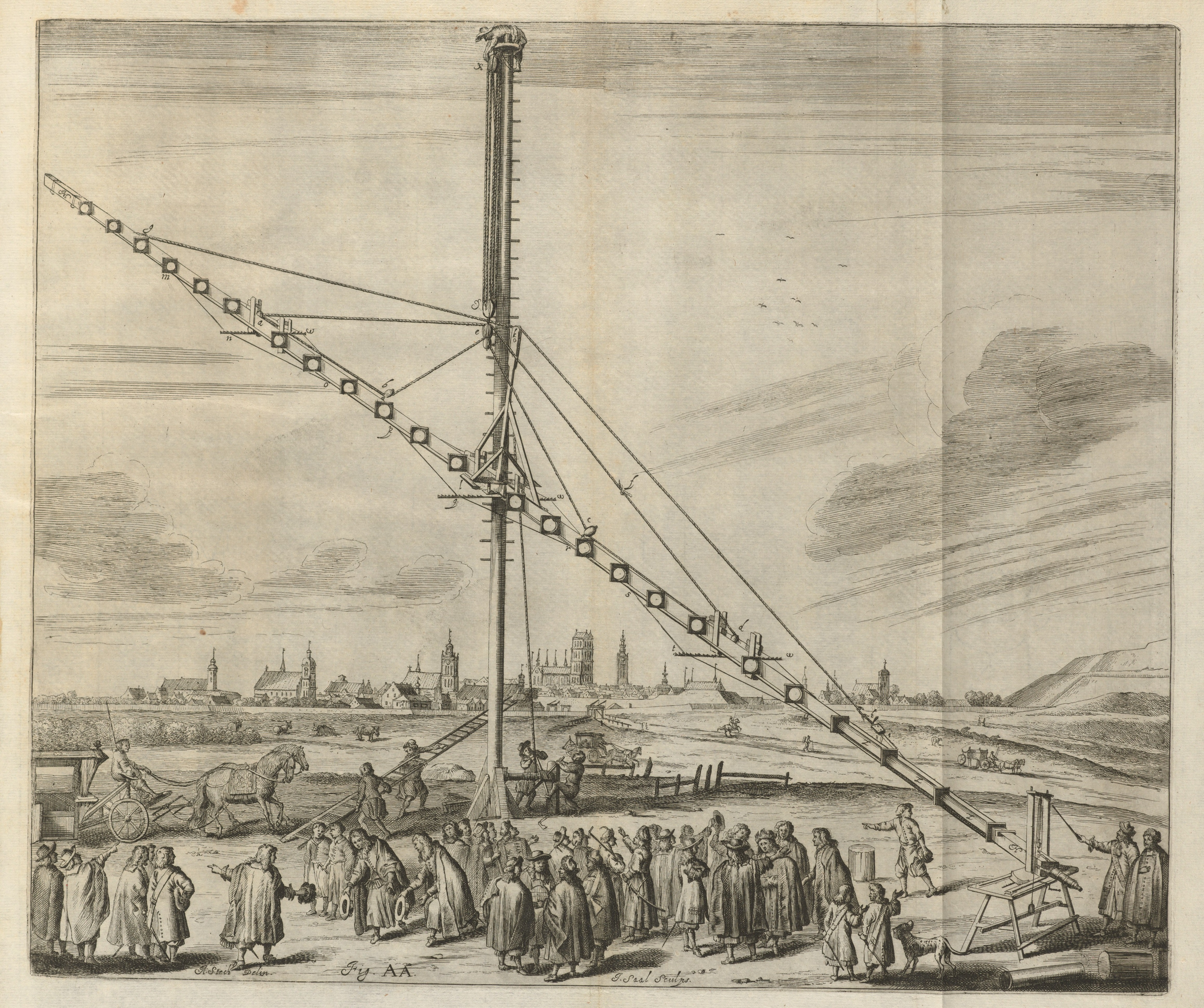
Engraved illustration of a 45 m (148 ft) focal length Keplerian astronomical refracting telescope built by Johannes Hevelius. From his book, "Machina coelestis" (first part), published in 1673.

The sharpness of the image in Kepler's telescope was limited by the chromatic aberration introduced by the non-uniform refractive properties of the objective lens. The only way to overcome this limitation at high magnifying powers was to create objectives with very long focal lengths. Giovanni Cassini discovered Saturn's fifth satellite (Rhea) in 1672 with a telescope 35 feet (11 m) long. Astronomers such as Johannes Hevelius were constructing telescopes with focal lengths as long as 150 feet (46 m). Besides having exceptionally long tubes, these telescopes needed scaffolding or long masts and cranes to hold them up. Their value as research tools was minimal, since the telescope's frame "tube" flexed and vibrated in the slightest breeze and sometimes collapsed altogether.

===== Aerial telescopes =====
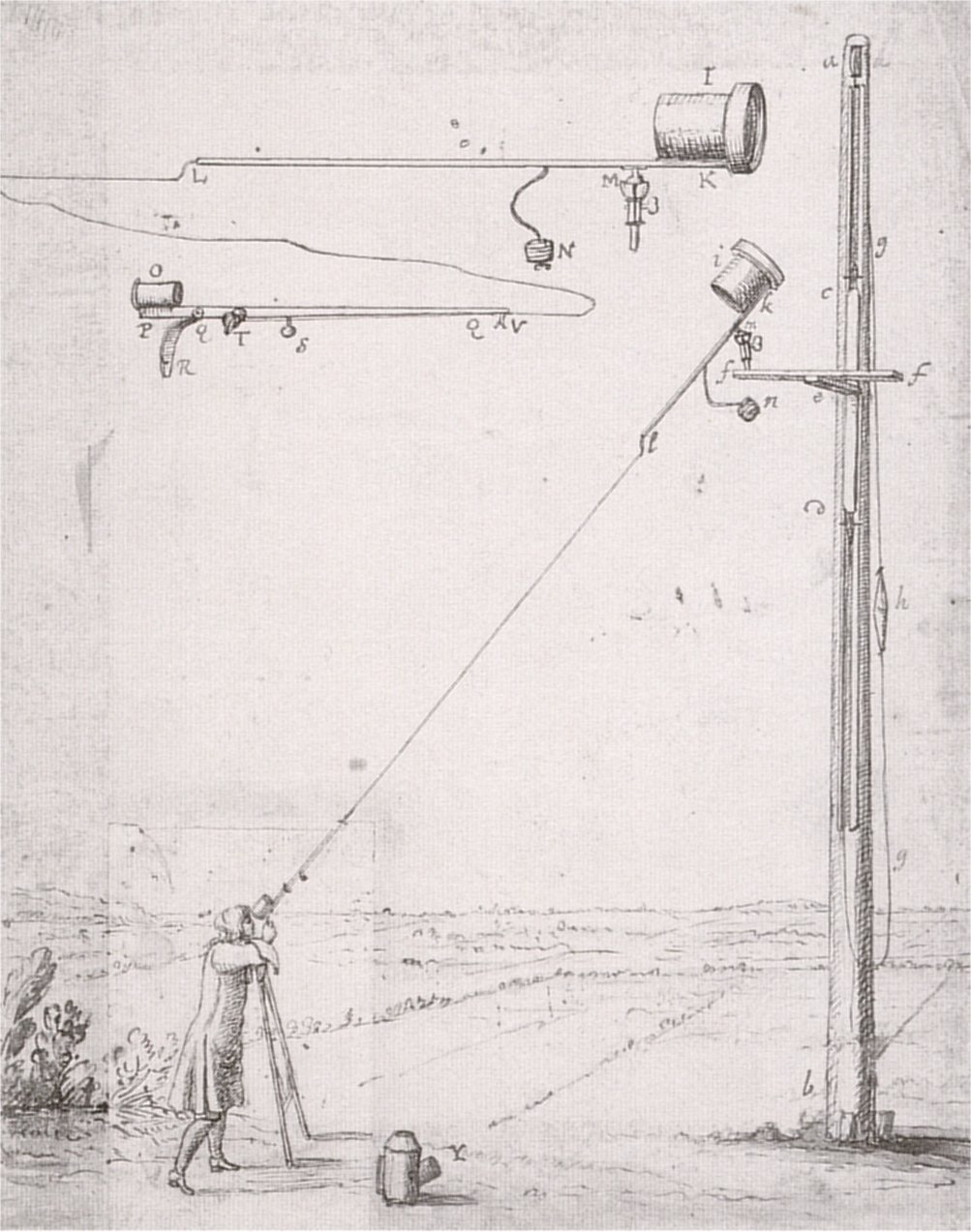
Huygens aerial telescope, 1684

In some of the very long refracting telescopes constructed after 1675, no tube was employed at all. The objective was mounted on a swiveling ball-joint on top of a pole, tree, or any available tall structure and aimed by means of string or connecting rod. The eyepiece was handheld or mounted on a stand at the focus, and the image was found by trial and error. These were consequently termed aerial telescopes. and have been attributed to Christiaan Huygens and his brother Constantijn Huygens, Jr. although it is not clear whether or not they invented it. Christiaan Huygens and his brother made objectives up to 8.5 inches (220 mm) diameter and 210 ft (64 m) focal length and others such as Adrien Auzout made telescopes with focal lengths up to 600 ft (180 m). Telescopes of such great length were naturally difficult to use, and must have taxed to the utmost the skill and patience of the observers. Aerial telescopes were employed by several other astronomers. Cassini discovered Saturn's third and fourth satellites in 1684 with aerial telescope objectives made by Giuseppe Campani that were 100 and 136 ft (30 and 41 m) in focal length.

==== Reflecting telescopes ====
The ability of a curved mirror to form an image may have been known since the time of Euclid and had been extensively studied by Alhazen in the 11th century. Galileo, Giovanni Francesco Sagredo, and others, spurred on by their knowledge that curved mirrors had similar properties to lenses, discussed the idea of building a telescope using a mirror as the image forming objective. Niccolò Zucchi, an Italian Jesuit astronomer and physicist, wrote in his book Optica philosophia of 1652 that he tried replacing the lens of a refracting telescope with a bronze concave mirror in 1616. Zucchi tried looking into the mirror with a hand held concave lens but did not get a satisfactory image, possibly due to the poor quality of the mirror, the angle it was tilted at, or the fact that his head partially obstructed the image.

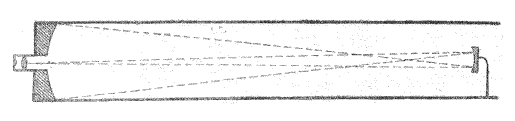
Light path in a Gregorian telescope.

In 1636 Marin Mersenne proposed a telescope consisting of a paraboloidal primary mirror and a paraboloidal secondary mirror bouncing the image through a hole in the primary, solving the problem of viewing the image. James Gregory went into further detail in his book Optica Promota (1663), pointing out that a reflecting telescope with a mirror that was shaped like the part of a conic section, would correct spherical aberration as well as the chromatic aberration seen in refractors. The design he came up with bears his name: the "Gregorian telescope"; but according to his own confession, Gregory had no practical skill and he could find no optician capable of realizing his ideas and after some fruitless attempts, was obliged to abandon all hope of bringing his telescope into practical use.

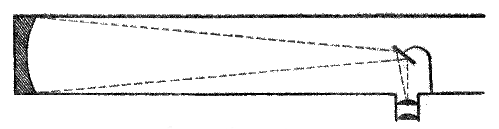
Light path in a Newtonian telescope.

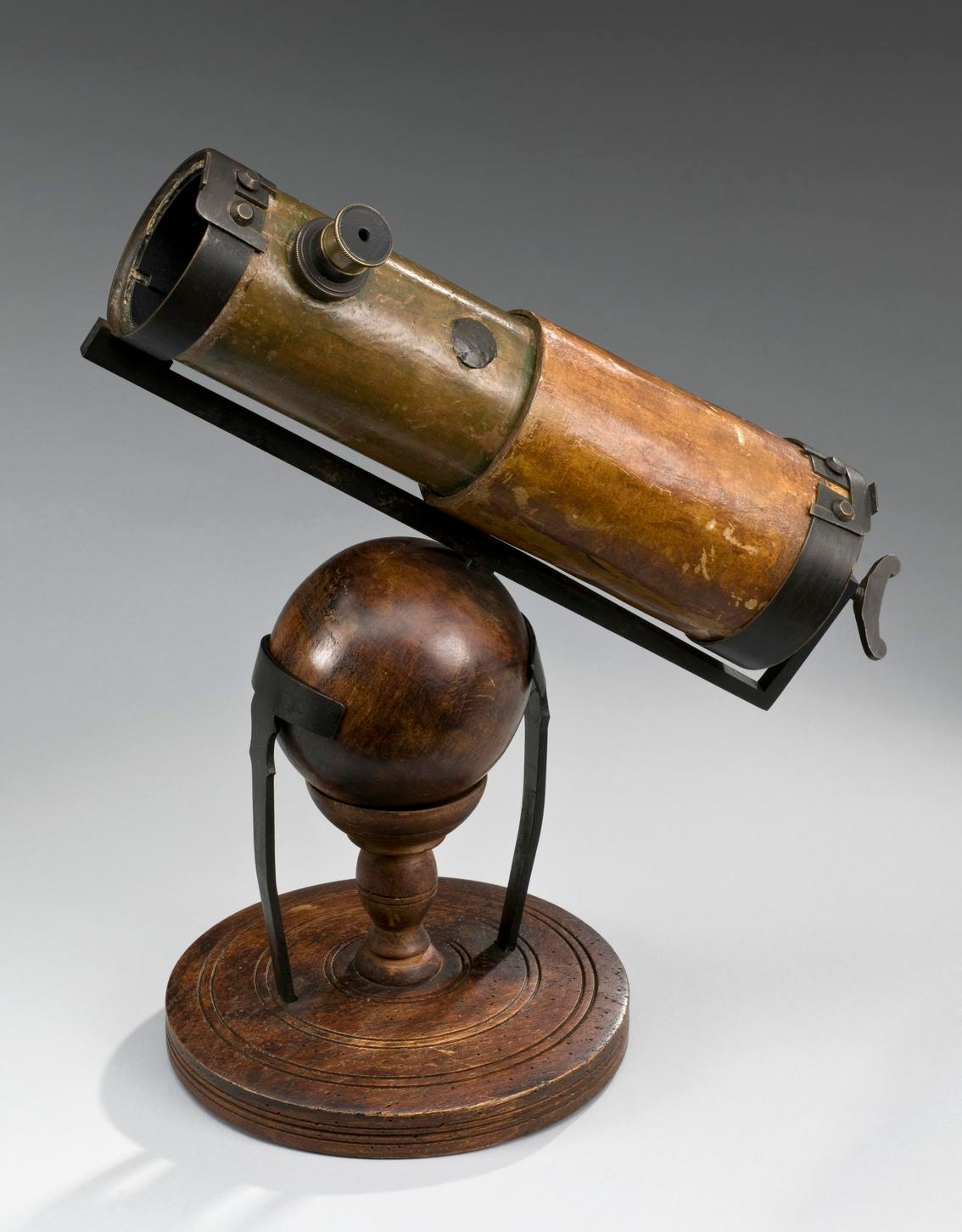
A replica of Newton's second reflecting telescope which was presented to the Royal Society in 1672.

In 1666 Isaac Newton, based on his theories of refraction and color, perceived that the faults of the refracting telescope were due more to a lens's varying refraction of light of different colors than to a lens's imperfect shape. He concluded that light could not be refracted through a lens without causing chromatic aberrations, although he incorrectly concluded from some rough experiments that all refracting substances would diverge the prismatic colors in a constant proportion to their mean refraction. From these experiments Newton concluded that no improvement could be made in the refracting telescope. Newton's experiments with mirrors showed that they did not suffer from the chromatic errors of lenses, for all colors of light the angle of incidence reflected in a mirror was equal to the angle of reflection, so as a proof to his theories Newton set out to build a reflecting telescope. Newton completed his first telescope in 1668 and it is the earliest known functional reflecting telescope. After much experiment, he chose an alloy (speculum metal) of tin and copper as the most suitable material for his objective mirror. He later devised means for grinding and polishing them, but chose a spherical shape for his mirror instead of a parabola to simplify construction. He added to his reflector what is the hallmark of the design of a "Newtonian telescope", a secondary "diagonal" mirror near the primary mirror's focus to reflect the image at 90° angle to an eyepiece mounted on the side of the telescope. This unique addition allowed the image to be viewed with minimal obstruction of the objective mirror. He also made all the tube, mount, and fittings. Newton's first compact reflecting telescope had a mirror diameter of 1.3 inches and a focal ratio of f/5. With it he found that he could see the four Galilean moons of Jupiter and the crescent phase of the planet Venus. Encouraged by this success, he made a second telescope with a magnifying power of 38x which he presented to the Royal Society of London in December 1671. This type of telescope is still called a Newtonian telescope.

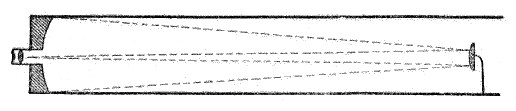
Light path in a Cassegrain telescope.

A third form of reflecting telescope, the "Cassegrain reflector" was devised in 1672 by Laurent Cassegrain. The telescope had a small convex hyperboloidal secondary mirror placed near the prime focus to reflect light through a central hole in the main mirror.

No further practical advance appears to have been made in the design or construction of the reflecting telescopes for another 50 years until John Hadley (best known as the inventor of the octant) developed ways to make precision aspheric and parabolic speculum metal mirrors. In 1721 he showed the first parabolic Newtonian reflector to the Royal Society. It had a 6-inch (15 cm) diameter, 62 3/4-inch (159 cm) focal length speculum metal objective mirror. The instrument was examined by James Pound and James Bradley. After remarking that Newton's telescope had lain neglected for fifty years, they stated that Hadley had sufficiently shown that the invention did not consist in bare theory. They compared its performance with that of a 7.5 inches (190 mm) diameter aerial telescope originally presented to the Royal Society by Constantijn Huygens, Jr. and found that Hadley's reflector, "will bear such a charge as to make it magnify the object as many times as the latter with its due charge", and that it represents objects as distinct, though not altogether so clear and bright.

Bradley and Samuel Molyneux, having been instructed by Hadley in his methods of polishing speculum metal, succeeded in producing large reflecting telescopes of their own, one of which had a focal length of 8 ft (2.4 m). These methods of fabricating mirrors were passed on by Molyneux to two London opticians —Scarlet and Hearn— who started a business manufacturing telescopes.

The British mathematician, optician James Short began experimenting with building telescopes based on Gregory's designs in the 1730s. He first tried making his mirrors out of glass as suggested by Gregory, but he later switched to speculum metal mirrors creating Gregorian telescopes with original designers parabolic and elliptic figures. Short then adopted telescope-making as his profession which he practised first in Edinburgh, and afterward in London. All Short's telescopes were of the Gregorian form. Short died in London in 1768, having made a considerable fortune selling telescopes.

Since speculum metal mirror secondaries or diagonal mirrors greatly reduced the light that reached the eyepiece, several reflecting telescope designers tried to do away with them. In 1762 Mikhail Lomonosov presented a reflecting telescope before the Russian Academy of Sciences forum. It had its primary mirror tilted at four degrees to telescope's axis so the image could be viewed via an eyepiece mounted at the front of the telescope tube without the observer's head blocking the incoming light. This innovation was not published until 1827, so this type came to be called the Herschelian telescope after a similar design by William Herschel.

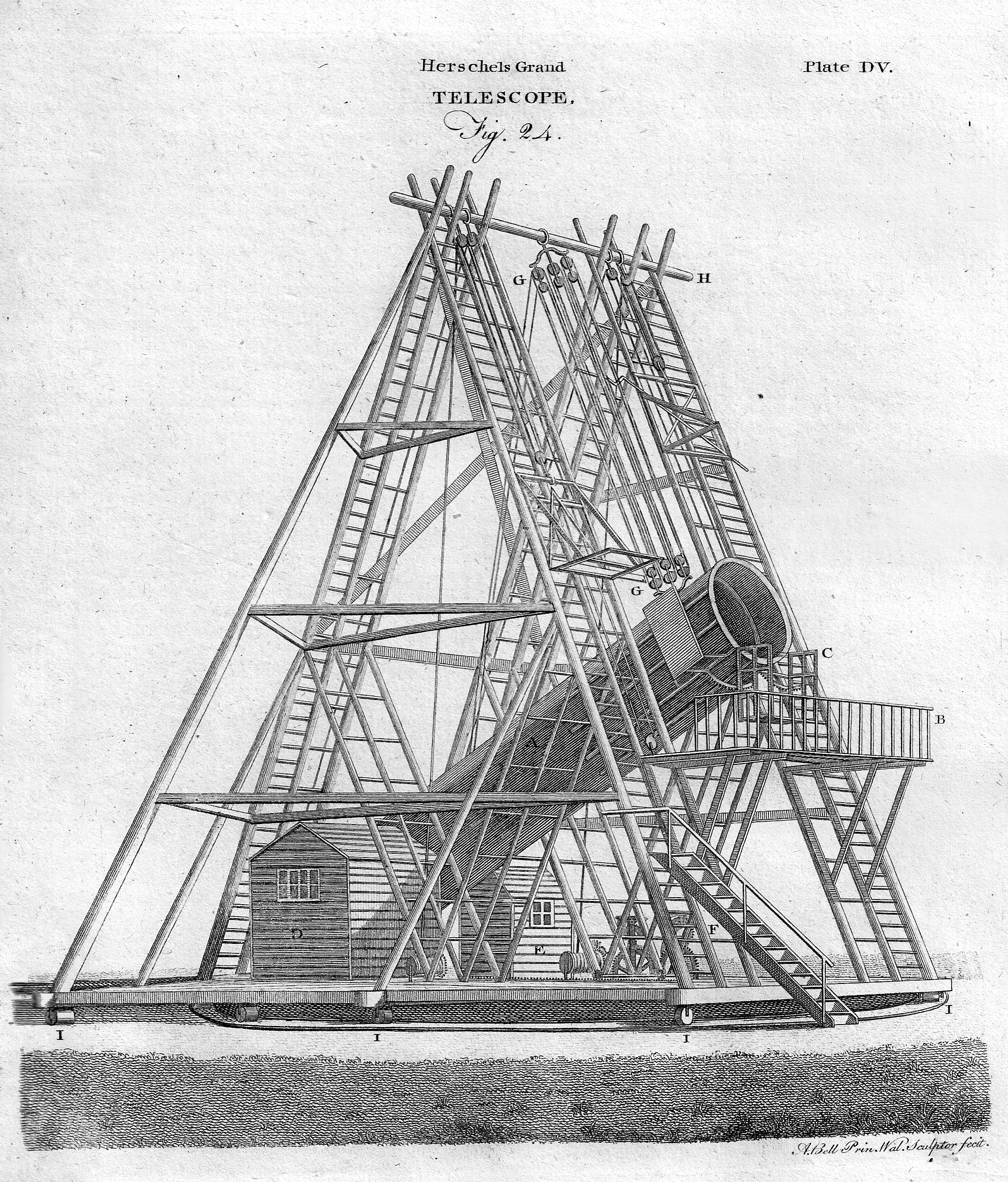
William Herschel's 49-inch (1,200 mm) "40-foot" telescope of 1789. Illustration from Encyclopædia Britannica Third Edition published in 1797.

About the year 1774 William Herschel (then a teacher of music in Bath, England) began to occupy his leisure hours with the construction of reflector telescope mirrors, finally devoted himself entirely to their construction and use in astronomical research. In 1778, he selected a 6 1/4-inch (16 cm) reflector mirror (the best of some 400 telescope mirrors which he had made) and with it, built a 7-foot (2.1 m) focal length telescope. Using this telescope, he made his early brilliant astronomical discoveries. In 1783, Herschel completed a reflector of approximately 18 inches (46 cm) in diameter and 20 ft (6.1 m) focal length. He observed the heavens with this telescope for some twenty years, replacing the mirror several times. In 1789 Herschel finished building his largest reflecting telescope with a mirror of 49 inches (120 cm) and a focal length of 40 ft (12 m), (commonly known as his 40-foot telescope) at his new home, at Observatory House in Slough, England. To cut down on the light loss from the poor reflectivity of the speculum mirrors of that day, Herschel eliminated the small diagonal mirror from his design and tilted his primary mirror so he could view the formed image directly. This design has come to be called the Herschelian telescope. He discovered Saturn's sixth known moon, Enceladus, the first night he used it (August 28, 1789), and on September 17, its seventh known moon, Mimas. This telescope was world's largest telescope for over 50 years. However, this large scope was difficult to handle and thus less used than his favorite 18.7-inch reflector.

In 1845 William Parsons, 3rd Earl of Rosse built his 72-inch (180 cm) Newtonian reflector called the "Leviathan of Parsonstown" with which he discovered the spiral form of galaxies.

All of these larger reflectors suffered from the poor reflectivity and fast tarnishing nature of their speculum metal mirrors. This meant they need more than one mirror per telescope since mirrors had to be frequently removed and re-polished. This was time-consuming since the polishing process could change the curve of the mirror, so it usually had to be "re-figured" to the correct shape.

==== Achromatic refracting telescopes ====
Light path through an achromatic lens.

From the time of the invention of the first refracting telescopes it was generally supposed that chromatic errors seen in lenses simply arose from errors in the spherical figure of their surfaces. Opticians tried to construct lenses of varying forms of curvature to correct these errors. Isaac Newton discovered in 1666 that chromatic colors actually arose from the un-even refraction of light as it passed through the glass medium. This led opticians to experiment with lenses constructed of more than one type of glass in an attempt to canceling the errors produced by each type of glass. It was hoped that this would create an "achromatic lens"; a lens that would focus all colors to a single point, and produce instruments of much shorter focal length.

The first person who succeeded in making a practical achromatic refracting telescope was Chester Moore Hall from Essex, England. He argued that the different humours of the human eye refract rays of light to produce an image on the retina which is free from color, and he reasonably argued that it might be possible to produce a like result by combining lenses composed of different refracting media. After devoting some time to the inquiry he found that by combining two lenses formed of different kinds of glass, he could make an achromatic lens where the effects of the unequal refractions of two colors of light (red and blue) was corrected. In 1733, he succeeded in constructing telescope lenses which exhibited much reduced chromatic aberration. One of his instruments had an objective measuring 2 1/2 inches (6.4 cm) with a relatively short focal length of 20 inches (51 cm).

Hall was a man of independent means and seems to have been careless of fame; at least he took no trouble to communicate his invention to the world. At a trial in Westminster Hall about the patent rights granted to John Dollond (Watkin v. Dollond), Hall was admitted to be the first inventor of the achromatic telescope. However, it was ruled by Lord Mansfield that "it was not the person who locked his invention in his scrutoire who ought to profit for such invention, but the one who brought it forth for the benefit of mankind."

In 1747, Leonhard Euler sent to the Prussian Academy of Sciences a paper in which he tried to prove the possibility of correcting both the chromatic and the spherical aberration of a lens. Like Gregory and Hall, he argued that since the various humours of the human eye were so combined as to produce a perfect image, it should be possible by suitable combinations of lenses of different refracting media to construct a perfect telescope objective. Adopting a hypothetical law of the dispersion of differently colored rays of light, he proved analytically the possibility of constructing an achromatic objective composed of lenses of glass and water.

All of Euler's efforts to produce an actual objective of this construction were fruitless—a failure which he attributed solely to the difficulty of procuring lenses that worked precisely to the requisite curves. John Dollond agreed with the accuracy of Euler's analysis, but disputed his hypothesis on the grounds that it was purely a theoretical assumption: that the theory was opposed to the results of Newton's experiments on the refraction of light, and that it was impossible to determine a physical law from analytical reasoning alone.

In 1754, Euler sent to the Berlin Academy a further paper in which starting from the hypothesis that light consists of vibrations excited in an elastic fluid by luminous bodies—and that the difference of color of light is due to the greater or lesser frequency of these vibrations in a given time— he deduced his previous results. He did not doubt the accuracy of Newton's experiments quoted by Dollond.

Dollond did not reply to this, but soon afterwards he received an abstract of a paper by the Swedish mathematician and astronomer, Samuel Klingenstierna, which led him to doubt the accuracy of the results deduced by Newton on the dispersion of refracted light. Klingenstierna showed from purely geometrical considerations (fully appreciated by Dollond) that the results of Newton's experiments could not be brought into harmony with other universally accepted facts of refraction.

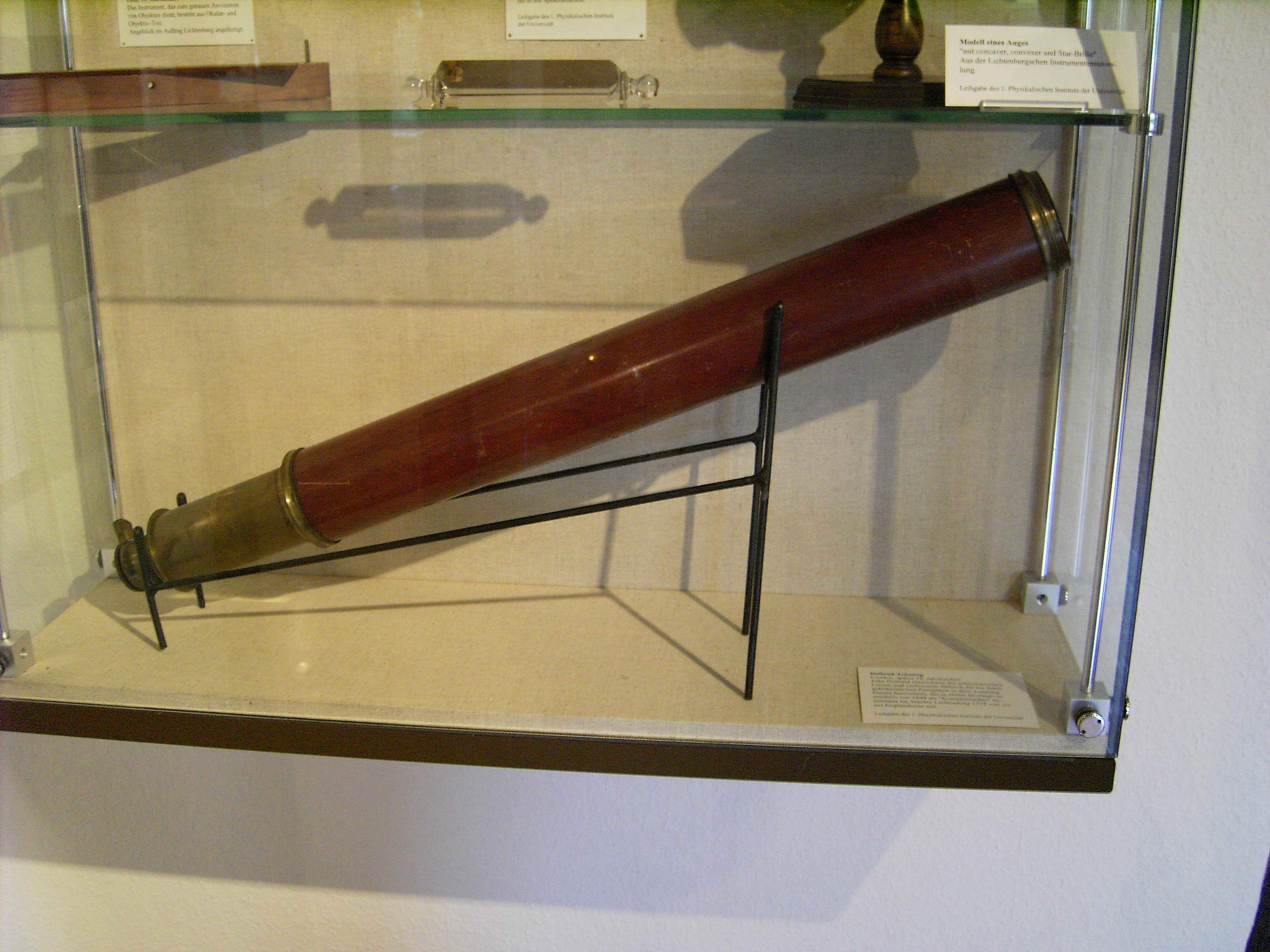
Dollond telescope.

As a practical man, Dollond at once put his doubts to the test of experiment: he confirmed the conclusions of Klingenstierna, discovered a difference far beyond his hopes in the refractive qualities of different kinds of glass with respect to the divergence of colors, and was thus rapidly led to the construction of lenses in which first the chromatic aberration—and afterwards—the spherical aberration were corrected.

Dollond was aware of the conditions necessary for the attainment of achromatism in refracting telescopes, but relied on the accuracy of experiments made by Newton. His writings show that with the exception of his bravado, he would have arrived sooner at a discovery for which his mind was fully prepared. Dollond's paper recounts the successive steps by which he arrived at his discovery independently of Hall's earlier invention—and the logical processes by which these steps were suggested to his mind.

In 1765 Peter Dollond (son of John Dollond) introduced the triple objective, which consisted of a combination of two convex lenses of crown glass with a concave flint lens between them. He made many telescopes of this kind.

The difficulty of procuring disks of glass (especially of flint glass) of suitable purity and homogeneity limited the diameter and light gathering power of the lenses found in the achromatic telescope. It was in vain that the French Academy of Sciences offered prizes for large perfect disks of optical flint glass.

The difficulties with the impractical metal mirrors of reflecting telescopes led to the construction of large refracting telescopes. By 1866 refracting telescopes had reached 18 inches (46 cm) in aperture with many larger "Great refractors" being built in the mid to late 19th century. In 1897, the refractor reached its maximum practical limit in a research telescope with the construction of the Yerkes Observatorys' 40-inch (100 cm) refractor (although a larger refractor Great Paris Exhibition Telescope of 1900 with an objective of 49.2 inches (1.25 m) diameter was temporarily exhibited at the Paris 1900 Exposition). No larger refractors could be built because of gravity's effect on the lens. Since a lens can only be held in place by its edge, the center of a large lens will sag due to gravity, distorting the image it produces.

=== Large reflecting telescopes ===
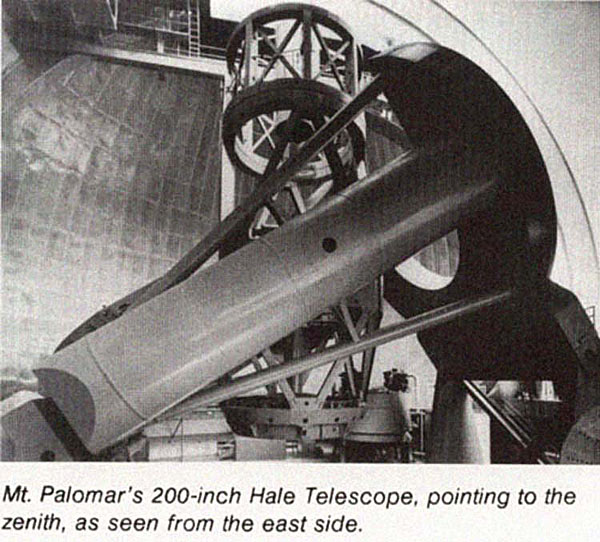
The 200-inch (5.1 m) Hale Telescope at Mount Palomar

In 1856–57, Karl August von Steinheil and Léon Foucault introduced a process of depositing a layer of silver on glass telescope mirrors. The silver layer was not only much more reflective and longer lasting than the finish on speculum mirrors, it had the advantage of being able to be removed and re-deposited without changing the shape of the glass substrate. Towards the end of the 19th century very large silver on glass mirror reflecting telescopes were built.

The beginning of the 20th century saw construction of the first of the "modern" large research reflectors, designed for precision photographic imaging and located at remote high altitude clear sky locations such as the 60-inch Hale Telescope of 1908, and the 100-inch (2.5 m) Hooker telescope in 1917, both located at Mount Wilson Observatory. These and other telescopes of this size had to have provisions to allow for the removal of their main mirrors for re-silvering every few months. John Donavan Strong, a young physicist at the California Institute of Technology, developed a technique for coating a mirror with a much longer lasting aluminum coating using thermal vacuum evaporation. In 1932, he became the first person to "aluminize" a mirror; three years later the 60-inch (1,500 mm) and 100-inch (2,500 mm) telescopes became the first large astronomical telescopes to have their mirrors aluminized. 1948 saw the completion of the 200-inch (510 cm) Hale reflector at Mount Palomar which was the largest telescope in the world up until the completion of the massive 605 cm (238 in) BTA-6 in Russia twenty-seven years later. The Hale reflector introduced several technical innovations used in future telescopes, including hydrostatic bearings for very low friction, the Serrurier truss for equal deflections of the two mirrors as the tube sags under gravity, and the use of Pyrex low-expansion glass for the mirrors. The arrival of substantially larger telescopes had to await the introduction of methods other than the rigidity of glass to maintain the proper shape of the mirror.

==== Active and adaptive optics ====
The 1980s saw the introduction of two new technologies for building larger telescopes and improving image quality, known as active optics and adaptive optics. In active optics, an image analyser senses the aberrations of a star image a few times per minute, and a computer adjusts many support forces on the primary mirror and the location of the secondary mirror to maintain the optics in optimal shape and alignment. This is too slow to correct for atmospheric blurring effects, but enables the use of thin single mirrors up to 8 m diameter, or even larger segmented mirrors. This method was pioneered by the ESO New Technology Telescope in the late 1980s.

The 1990s saw a new generation of giant telescopes appear using active optics, beginning with the construction of the first of the two 10 m (390 in) Keck telescopes in 1993. Other giant telescopes built since then include: the two Gemini telescopes, the four separate telescopes of the Very Large Telescope, and the Large Binocular Telescope.

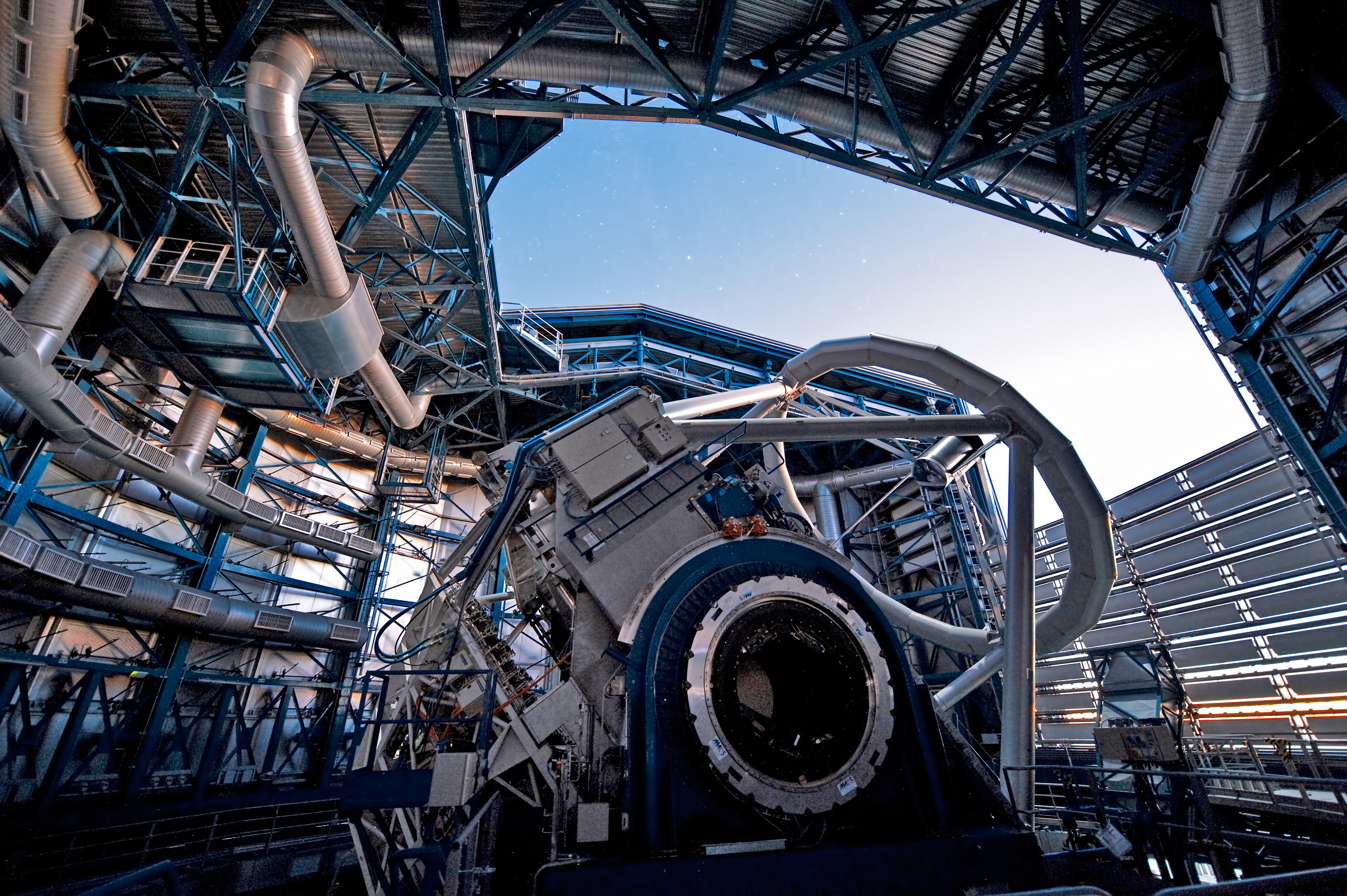
ESO's VLT boasts advanced adaptive optics systems, which counteract the blurring effects of Earth's atmosphere.

Adaptive optics uses a similar principle, but applying corrections several hundred times per second to compensate the effects of rapidly changing optical distortion due to the motion of turbulence in Earth's atmosphere. Adaptive optics works by measuring the distortions in a wavefront and then compensating for them by rapid changes of actuators applied to a small deformable mirror or with a liquid crystal array filter. AO was first envisioned by Horace W. Babcock in 1953, but did not come into common usage in astronomical telescopes until advances in computer and detector technology during the 1990s made it possible to calculate the compensation needed in real time. In adaptive optics, the high-speed corrections needed mean that a fairly bright star is needed very close to the target of interest (or an artificial star is created by a laser). Also, with a single star or laser the corrections are only effective over a very narrow field (tens of arcsec), and current systems operating on several 8-10m telescopes work mainly in near-infrared wavelengths for single-object observations.

Developments of adaptive optics include systems with multiple lasers over a wider corrected field, and/or working above kiloHertz rates for good correction at visible wavelengths; these are currently in progress but not yet in routine operation as of 2015.

== Other wavelengths ==
The twentieth century saw the construction of telescopes which could produce images using wavelengths other than visible light starting in 1931 when Karl Jansky discovered astronomical objects gave off radio emissions; this prompted a new era of observational astronomy after World War II, with telescopes being developed for other parts of the electromagnetic spectrum from radio to gamma-rays.

=== Radio telescopes ===
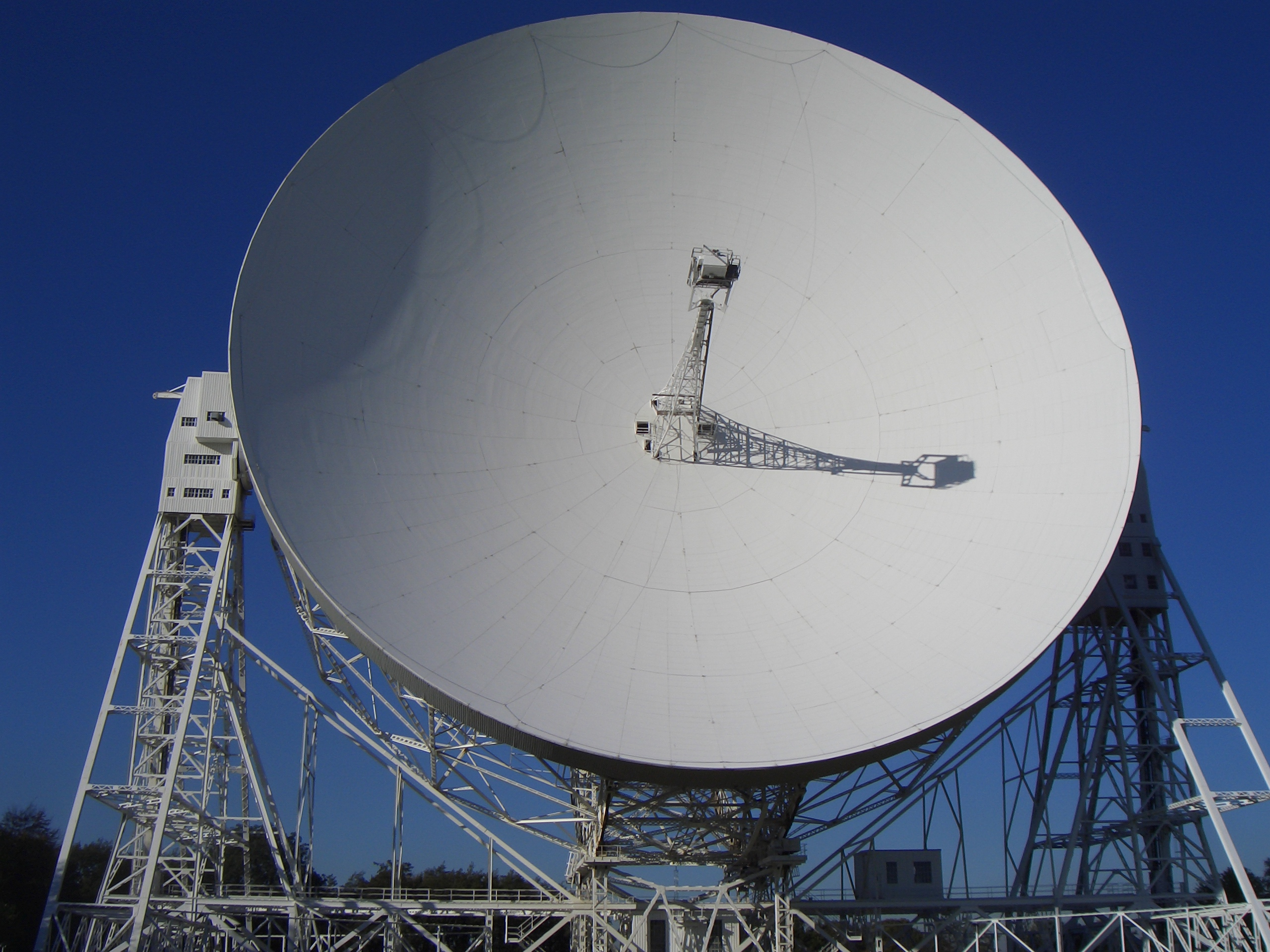
The 250-foot (76 m) Lovell radio telescope at Jodrell Bank Observatory.

Radio astronomy began in 1931 when Karl Jansky discovered that the Milky Way was a source of radio emission while doing research on terrestrial static with a direction antenna. Building on Jansky's work, Grote Reber built a more sophisticated purpose-built radio telescope in 1937, with a 31.4-foot (9.6 m) dish; using this, he discovered various unexplained radio sources in the sky. Interest in radio astronomy grew after the Second World War when much larger dishes were built including: the 250-foot (76 m) Jodrell bank telescope (1957), the 300-foot (91 m) Green Bank Telescope (1962), and the 100-metre (330 ft) Effelsberg telescope (1971). The huge 1,000-foot (300 m) Arecibo Telescope (1963) was so large that it was fixed into a natural depression in the ground; the central antenna could be steered to allow the telescope to study objects up to twenty degrees from the zenith. However, not every radio telescope is of the dish type. For example, the Mills Cross Telescope (1954) was an early example of an array which used two perpendicular lines of antennae 1,500 feet (460 m) in length to survey the sky.

High-energy radio waves are known as microwaves and this has been an important area of astronomy ever since the discovery of the cosmic microwave background radiation in 1964. Many ground-based radio telescopes can study microwaves. Short wavelength microwaves are best studied from space because water vapor (even at high altitudes) strongly weakens the signal. The Cosmic Background Explorer (1989) revolutionized the study of the microwave background radiation.

Because radio telescopes have low resolution, they were the first instruments to use interferometry allowing two or more widely separated instruments to simultaneously observe the same source. Very long baseline interferometry extended the technique over thousands of kilometers and allowed resolutions down to a few milli-arcseconds.

A telescope like the Large Millimeter Telescope (active since 2006) observes from 0.85 to 4 mm (850 to 4,000 μm), bridging between the far-infrared/submillimeter telescopes and longer wavelength radio telescopes including the microwave band from about 1 mm (1,000 μm) to 1,000 mm (1.0 m) in wavelength.

=== Infrared telescopes (700 nm/ 0.7 μm – 1000 μm/1 mm) ===
Although most infrared radiation is absorbed by the atmosphere, infrared astronomy at certain wavelengths can be conducted on high mountains where there is little absorption by atmospheric water vapor. Ever since suitable detectors became available, most optical telescopes at high-altitudes have been able to image at infrared wavelengths. Some telescopes such as the 3.8-metre (150 in) UKIRT, and the 3-metre (120 in) IRTF — both on Mauna Kea — are dedicated infrared telescopes. The launch of the IRAS satellite in 1983 revolutionized infrared astronomy from space. This reflecting telescope which had a 60-centimetre (24 in) mirror, operated for nine months until its supply of coolant (liquid helium) ran out. It surveyed the entire sky detecting 245,000 infrared sources—more than 100 times the number previously known.

=== Ultra-violet telescopes (10 nm – 400 nm) ===
Although optical telescopes can image the near ultraviolet, the ozone layer in the stratosphere absorbs ultraviolet radiation shorter than 300 nm so most ultra-violet astronomy is conducted with satellites. Ultraviolet telescopes resemble optical telescopes, but conventional aluminium-coated mirrors cannot be used and alternative coatings such as magnesium fluoride or lithium fluoride are used instead. The Orbiting Solar Observatory satellite carried out observations in the ultra-violet as early as 1962. The International Ultraviolet Explorer (1978) systematically surveyed the sky for eighteen years, using a 45-centimetre (18 in) aperture telescope with two spectroscopes. Extreme-ultraviolet astronomy (10–100 nm) is a discipline in its own right and involves many of the techniques of X-ray astronomy; the Extreme Ultraviolet Explorer (1992) was a satellite operating at these wavelengths.

=== X-ray telescopes (0.01 nm – 10 nm) ===
X-rays from space do not reach Earth's surface, so X-ray astronomy must be conducted above Earth's atmosphere. The first X-ray experiments were conducted on sub-orbital rocket flights, which enabled the first detection of X-rays from the sun (1948), and then from the first galactic X-ray sources: Scorpius X-1 (June 1962) and the Crab Nebula (October 1962). Since then, X-ray telescopes (Wolter telescopes) have been built using nested grazing-incidence mirrors which deflect X-rays to a detector. Some of the OAO satellites conducted X-ray astronomy in the late 1960s, but the first dedicated X-ray satellite was the Uhuru (1970) which discovered 300 sources. More recent X-ray satellites include: the EXOSAT (1983), ROSAT (1990), Chandra (1999), and Newton (1999).

=== Gamma-ray telescopes (less than 0.01 nm) ===
Gamma rays are absorbed high in Earth's atmosphere, so most gamma-ray astronomy is conducted with satellites. Gamma-ray telescopes use scintillation counters, spark chambers and more recently, solid-state detectors. The angular resolution of these devices is typically very poor. There were balloon-borne experiments in the early 1960s, but gamma-ray astronomy really began with the launch of the OSO 3 satellite in 1967; the first dedicated gamma-ray satellites were SAS B (1972) and Cos B (1975). The Compton Gamma Ray Observatory (1991) was a big improvement on previous surveys. Very high-energy gamma-rays (above 200 GeV) can be detected from the ground via the Cerenkov radiation that is produced by the passage of the gamma-rays through Earth's atmosphere. Several Cerenkov imaging telescopes have been built around the world, including: the HEGRA (1987), STACEE (2001), HESS (2003), and MAGIC (2004).

== Interferometric telescopes ==
Map of the Square Kilometre Array, its membership and setup, which puts together radio telescopes in arrays for interferomrtric observation.

In 1868, Fizeau noted that the purpose of the arrangement of mirrors or glass lenses in a conventional telescope was simply to provide an approximation to a Fourier transform of the optical wave field entering the telescope. As this mathematical transformation was well understood and could be performed mathematically on paper, he noted that by using an array of small instruments it would be possible to measure the diameter of a star with the same precision as a single telescope which was as large as the whole array— a technique which later became known as astronomical interferometry. It was not until 1891 that Albert A. Michelson successfully used this technique for the measurement of astronomical angular diameters: the diameters of Jupiter's satellites (Michelson 1891). Thirty years later, a direct interferometric measurement of a stellar diameter was finally realized by Michelson & Francis G. Pease (1921) which was applied by their 20 ft (6.1 m) interferometer mounted on the 100 inch Hooker Telescope on Mount Wilson.

The next major development came in 1946, when Martin Ryle and Derek Vonberg located a number of new cosmic radio sources by constructing a radio analogue of the Michelson interferometer. The signals from two radio antennas were added electronically to produce interference. Ryle and Vonberg's telescope used Earth's rotation to scan the sky in one dimension. With the development of larger arrays and of computers which could rapidly perform the necessary Fourier transforms, the first aperture synthesis imaging instruments were soon developed which could obtain high resolution images without the need of a giant parabolic reflector to perform the Fourier transform. This technique is now used in most radio astronomy observations. Radio astronomers soon developed the mathematical methods to perform aperture synthesis Fourier imaging using much larger arrays of telescopes —often spread across more than one continent. In the 1980s, the aperture synthesis technique was extended to visible light as well as infrared astronomy, providing the first very high resolution optical and infrared images of nearby stars.

In 1995, this imaging technique was demonstrated on an array of separate optical telescopes for the first time, allowing a further improvement in resolution, and also allowing even higher resolution imaging of stellar surfaces. The same techniques have now been applied at a number of other astronomical telescope arrays including: the Navy Prototype Optical Interferometer, the CHARA array, and the IOTA array.

In 2008, Max Tegmark and Matias Zaldarriaga proposed a "Fast Fourier Transform Telescope" design in which the lenses and mirrors could be dispensed with altogether when computers become fast enough to perform all the necessary transforms.

== See also ==
- 400 Years of the Telescope documentary
- History of astronomy
- Astronomical interferometer
- Timeline of telescope technology
- Timeline of telescopes, observatories, and observing technology
- International Year of Astronomy, 2009 marking the 400th anniversary of Galileo's first astronomical observations using his telescope
- List of optical telescopes
- List of largest optical refracting telescopes
- List of space telescopes
- List of telescope types
- Visible-light astronomy
