= Lipperhey =

Hans Lippershey, also known by the name Lipperhey, was a German-Dutch spectacle-maker.

Lippershey or Lipperhey is the name of several celestial objects named after him and so may also refer to:

- Lippershey (crater), a relatively tiny lunar impact crater
- 31338 Lipperhey, a minor planet
- Lipperhey (planet), an exoplanet also known as 55 Cancri d
