= Timeline of telescopes, observatories, and observing technology =

Timeline of telescopes, observatories, and observing technology.

== Before the Common Era (BCE) ==
=== 1900s BCE ===
- Taosi Astronomical Observatory, Xiangfen County, Linfen City, Shanxi Province, China

=== 1500s BCE ===
- Shadow clocks invented in ancient Egypt and Mesopotamia

=== 600s BCE ===
- 11th–7th century BCE, Zhou dynasty astronomical observatory (灵台) in Fenghao (today's Xi'an), China

=== 200s BCE ===
- Thirteen Towers solar observatory, Chankillo, Peru
- Antikythera Mechanism, a geared astronomical computer that calculates lunar and solar eclipses, the position of the Sun and the Moon the lunar phase (age of the Moon as seen from Earth), has several lunisolar calendars, including the Olympic Games calendar. It is at the National Archaeological Museum, Athens, Greece.

=== 100s BCE ===
- 220-206 BCE, Han dynasty astronomical observatory (灵台) in Chang'an and Luoyang. During East Han dynasty, astronomical observatory (灵台) built in Yanshi, Henan Province, China
- 220-150 BCE, Astrolabe invented by Apollonius of Perga

== Common Era (CE) ==
=== 400s ===
- 5th century – Observatory at Ujjain, India

=== 600s ===
- 632–647 – Cheomseongdae observatory is built in the reign of Queen Seondeok at Gyeongju, then the capital of Silla (present day South Korea)
- 618–1279 – Tang dynasty-Song dynasty, observatories built in Chang'an, Kaifeng, Hangzhou, China

=== 700s ===
- 700–96 – Brass astrolabe constructed by Muhammad al-Fazari based on Hellenistic sources

=== 800s ===
- 9th century – quadrant invented by Muhammad ibn Mūsā al-Khwārizmī in 9th century Baghdad and is used for astronomical calculations
- 800–33 – The first modern observatory research institute built in Baghdad, Iraq, by Arabic astronomers during time of Al-Mamun
- 825–35 – Al-Shammisiyyah observatory by Habash al-Hasib al-Marwazi in Baghdad, Iraq

=== 900s ===
- 10th century – Large astrolabe of diameter 1.4 meters constructed by Ibn Yunus
- 994 – First sextant constructed in Ray, Iran, by Abu-Mahmud al-Khujandi. It was a very large mural sextant that achieved a high level of accuracy for astronomical measurements.

=== 1000s ===
- 1000 – Mokattam observatory in Egypt for Al-Hakim bi-Amr Allah
- 11th century – Planisphere invented by Biruni
- 11th century – Universal latitude-independent astrolabe invented by Abū Ishāq Ibrāhīm al-Zarqālī (Arzachel)
- 1023 – Hamedan observatory in Persia
- c. 1030 – Treasury of Optics by Ibn al-Haytham (Alhazen) of Iraq and Egypt
- 1074–92 – Malikshah Observatory at Isfahan used by Omar Khayyám

=== 1100s ===
- 1100–50 – Jabir ibn Aflah develops instruments resembling and perhaps inspiring the torquetum, an observational instrument and mechanical analog computer device
- 1119–25 – Cairo al-Bataihi observatory for Al-Afdal Shahanshah

=== 1200s ===
- 1259 – Maragheh observatory and library of Nasir al-Din al-Tusi built in Persia under Hulagu Khan
- c. 1270 – Terrace for Managing Heaven 26 observatory network of Guo Shoujing under Khubilai Khan
- 1276 – Dengfeng Star Observatory Platform, Gaocheng, Dengfeng City, Henan Province, China

=== 1300s ===
- 1371 – The idea of using hours of equal time length throughout the year in a sundial was the innovation of Ibn al-Shatir

=== 1400s ===
- 1420 – Samarkand observatory of Ulugh Beg
- 1437 - Zij-i Sultani is published, the first star catalog since the Almagest
- 1442 – Beijing Ancient Observatory in China
- 1467–71 – Observatory at Nagyvarad Oradea, Kingdom of Hungary for Matthias Corvinus. Tabula Varadensis.
- 1472 – The Nuremberg observatory of Regiomontanus and Bernhard Walther.

=== 1500s ===
- 1560 – Kassel observatory under Landgrave Wilhelm IV of Hesse
- 1575–80 – Constantinople Observatory of Taqi ad-Din under Sultan Murad III
- 1576 – Royal Danish Astronomical Observatory Uraniborg at Ven by Tycho Brahe
- 1577–80 – Taqi al-Din invents a mechanical astronomical clock that measures time in seconds, one of the most important innovations in 16th-century practical astronomy, as previous clocks were not accurate enough to be used for astronomical purposes.
- 1577–80 – Taqi al-Din invents framed sextant
- 1581 – Royal Danish Astronomical Observatory Stjärneborg at Ven by Tycho Brahe

=== 1600s ===
- 1600 – Prague observatory in Benátky nad Jizerou by Tycho Brahe
- 1603 – Johann Bayer's Uranometria is published
- 1608 – Hans Lippershey tries to patent an optical refracting telescope, the first recorded functional telescope
- 1609 – Galileo Galilei builds his first optical refracting telescope
- 1616 – Niccolò Zucchi experiments with a reflecting telescope
- 1633 – Construction of Leiden University Observatory
- 1641 – William Gascoigne invents telescope cross hairs
- 1641 – Danzig/Gdansk observatory of Jan Hevelius
- 1642 – Copenhagen University Royal observatory
- 1661 – James Gregory proposes an optical reflecting telescope with parabolic mirrors
- 1667 – Paris Observatory
- 1668 – Isaac Newton constructs the first "practical" reflecting telescope, the Newtonian telescope
- 1672 – Laurent Cassegrain designs the Cassegrain telescope
- 1675 – Royal Greenwich Observatory of England
- 1684 – Christiaan Huygens publishes "Astroscopia Compendiaria" in which he described the design of very long aerial telescopes

=== 1700s ===
- 1704 – First observatory at Cambridge University (based at Trinity College)
- 1724 – Indian observatory of Sawai Jai Singh at Delhi
- 1725 – St. Petersburg observatory at Royal Academy
- 1732 – Indian observatories of Sawai Jai Singh at Varanasi, Ujjain, Mathura, Madras
- 1733 – Chester Moore Hall invents the achromatic lens refracting telescope
- 1734 – Indian observatory of Sawai Jai Singh at Jaipur
- 1753 – Real Observatorio de Cádiz (Spain)
- 1753 – Vilnius Observatory at Vilnius University, Lithuania
- 1758 – John Dollond reinvents the achromatic lens
- 1761 – Joseph-Nicolas Delisle 62 observing station network for observing the transit of Venus
- 1769 – Short reflectors used at 63 station network for transit of Venus
- 1774 – Vatican Observatory (Specola Vaticana), originally established as the Observatory of the Roman College.
- 1780 – Florence Specola observatory
- 1789 – William Herschel finishes a 49-inch (1.2 m) optical reflecting telescope, located in Slough, England
- 1798 – Real Observatorio de la Isla de Léon (actualmente Real Instituto y Observatorio de la Armada) (Spain)

=== 1800s ===
- 1803 National Astronomical Observatory (Colombia), the first observatory in the Americas
- 1836 Swathithirunal opened Trivandrum observatory
- 1839 Louis Jacques Mandé Daguerre (inventor of the daguerreotype photographic process) attempts to photograph the moon. Tracking errors in guiding the telescope during the long exposure made the photograph came out as an indistinct fuzzy spot
- 1840 – John William Draper takes make a successful photographic image of the Moon, the first astronomical photograph
- 1845 – Lord Rosse finishes the Birr Castle 72-inch (1.8 m) optical reflecting telescope, located in Parsonstown, Ireland
- 1849 – Santiago observatory set up by USA, later becomes Chilean National Observatory (now part of the University of Chile)
- 1859 – Kirchhoff and Bunsen develop spectroscopy
- 1864 – Herschel's so-called GC (General Catalogue) of nebulae and star clusters published
- 1868 – Janssen and Lockyer discover Helium observing spectra of the Sun
- 1871 – German Astronomical Association organized network of 13 (later 16) observatories for stellar proper motion studies
- 1863 – William Allen Miller and Sir William Huggins use the photographic wet collodion plate process to obtain the first ever photographic spectrogram of a star, Sirius and Capella.
- 1872 – Henry Draper photographs a spectrum of Vega that shows absorption lines.
- 1878 – Dreyer published a supplement to the GC of about 1000 new objects, the New General Catalogue
- 1883 – Andrew Ainslie Common uses the photographic dry plate process and a 36-inch (91 cm) reflecting telescope in his backyard to record 60 minute exposures of the Orion Nebula that for the first time showed stars too faint to be seen by the human eye.
- 1887 – Paris conference institutes Carte du Ciel project to map entire sky to 14th magnitude photographically
- 1888 – First light of 91cm refracting telescope at Lick Observatory, on Mount Hamilton near San Jose, California
- 1889 – Astronomical Society of the Pacific founded
- 1890 – Albert A. Michelson proposes the stellar interferometer
- 1892 – George Ellery Hale finishes a spectroheliograph, which allows the Sun to be photographed in the light of one element only
- 1897 – Alvan Clark finishes the Yerkes 40-inch (1.0 m) optical refracting telescope, located in Williams Bay, Wisconsin

=== 1900s ===
- 1902 – Dominion Observatory, Ottawa, Ontario, Canada established
- 1904 – Observatories of the Carnegie Institution of Washington founded
- 1907 – F.C. Brown and Joel Stebbins develop a selenium cell photometer at the University of Illinois Observatory.

==== 1910s ====
- 1912 – Joel Stebbins and Jakob Kunz begin to use a photometer using a photoelectric cell at the University of Illinois Observatory.
- 1917 – Mount Wilson 100-inch (2.5 m) optical reflecting telescope begins operation, located in Mount Wilson, California
- 1918 – 1.8m Plaskett Telescope begins operation at the Dominion Astrophysical Observatory, Victoria, British Columbia, Canada
- 1919 – International Astronomical Union (IAU) founded

==== 1930s ====
- 1930 – Bernard-Ferdinand Lyot invents the coronagraph
- 1930 – Karl Jansky builds a 30-meter long rotating aerial radio telescope This was the first radio telescope.
- 1933 – Bernard-Ferdinand Lyot invents the Lyot filter
- 1934 – Bernhard Schmidt finishes the first 14-inch (360 mm) Schmidt optical reflecting telescope
- 1936 – Palomar 18-inch (460 mm) Schmidt optical reflecting telescope begins operation, located in Palomar, California
- 1937 – Grote Reber builds a 31-foot (9.4 m) radio telescope

==== 1940s ====
- 1941 – Dmitri Dmitrievich Maksutov invents the Maksutov telescope which is adopted by major observatories in the Soviet Union and internationally. It is now also a popular design with amateur astronomers
- 1946 – Martin Ryle and his group perform the first astronomical observations with a radio interferometer
- 1947 – Bernard Lovell and his group complete the Jodrell Bank 218-foot (66 m) non-steerable radio telescope
- 1949 – Palomar 48-inch (1.2 m) Schmidt optical reflecting telescope begins operation, located in Palomar, California
- 1949 – Palomar 200-inch (5.1 m) optical reflecting telescope (Hale Telescope) begins regular operation, located in Palomar, California

==== 1950s ====
- 1953 – Luoxue Mountain Cosmic Rays Research Center, Yunnan Province, in China founded
- 1954 – Earth rotation aperture synthesis suggested (see e.g. Christiansen and Warburton (1955))
- 1956 – Dwingeloo Radio Observatory 25 m telescope completed, Dwingeloo, Netherlands
- 1957 – Bernard Lovell and his group complete the Jodrell Bank 250-foot (75 m) steerable radio telescope (the Lovell Telescope)
- 1957 – Peter Scheuer publishes his P(D) method for obtaining source counts of spatially unresolved sources
- 1959 – Radio Observatory of the University of Chile, located at Maipú, Chile founded
- 1959 – The 3C catalogue of radio sources is published (revised in 1962)
- 1959 – The Shane 120-inch (3.0 m) Telescope Opened at Lick Observatory

==== 1960s ====
- 1960 – Owens Valley 27-meter radio telescopes begin operation, located in Big Pine, California
- 1961 – Parkes 64-metre radio telescope begins operation, located near Parkes, Australia
- 1962 – European Southern Observatory (ESO) founded
- 1962 – Kitt Peak solar observatory founded
- 1962 – Green Bank, West Virginia 90m radio telescope
- 1962 – Orbiting Solar Observatory 1 satellite launched
- 1963 – Arecibo 300-meter radio telescope begins operation, located in Arecibo, Puerto Rico
- 1964 – Martin Ryle's 1-mile (1.6 km) radio interferometer begins operation, located in Cambridge, England
- 1965 – Owens Valley 40-meter radio telescope begins operation, located in Big Pine, California
- 1967 – First VLBI images, with 183 km baseline
- 1969 – Observations start at Big Bear Solar Observatory, located in Big Bear, California
- 1969 – Las Campanas Observatory

==== 1970s ====
- 1970 – Cerro Tololo 158-inch (4.0 m) optical reflecting telescope begins operation, located in Cerro Tololo, Chile
- 1970 – Kitt Peak National Observatory 158-inch (4.0 m) optical reflecting telescope begins operation, located near Tucson, Arizona
- 1970 – Uhuru x-ray telescope satellite
- 1970 – Antoine Labeyrie performs the first high-resolution optical speckle interferometry observations
- 1970 – Westerbork Synthesis Radio Telescope completed, near Westerbork, Netherlands
- 1972 – 100 m Effelsberg radio telescope inaugurated (Germany)
- 1973 – UK Schmidt Telescope 1.2 metre optical reflecting telescope begins operation, located in Anglo-Australian Observatory near Coonabarabran, Australia
- 1974 – Anglo-Australian Telescope 153-inch (3.9 m) optical reflecting telescope begins operation, located in Anglo-Australian Observatory near Coonabarabran, Australia
- 1975 – Gerald Smith, Frederick Landauer, and James Janesick use a CCD to observe Uranus, the first astronomical CCD observation
- 1975 – Antoine Labeyrie builds the first two-telescope optical interferometer
- 1976 – The 6-m BTA-6 (Bolshoi Teleskop Azimutalnyi or “Large Altazimuth Telescope”) goes into operation on Mt. Pashtukhov in the Russian Caucasus
- 1978 – Multiple Mirror 176-inch (4.5 m) equivalent optical/infrared reflecting telescope begins operation, located in Amado, Arizona
- 1978 – International Ultraviolet Explorer (IUE) telescope satellite
- 1978 – Einstein High Energy Astronomy Observatory x-ray telescope satellite
- 1979 – UKIRT 150-inch (3.8 m) infrared reflecting telescope begins operation, located at Mauna Kea Observatory, Hawaii
- 1979 – Canada-France-Hawaii 140-inch (3.6 m) optical reflecting telescope begins operation, located at Mauna Kea Observatory, Hawaii
- 1979 – NASA Infrared Telescope Facility 120-inch (3.0 m) infrared reflecting telescope begins operation, located at Mauna Kea, Hawaii

==== 1980s ====
- 1980 – Completion of construction of the VLA, located in Socorro, New Mexico
- 1983 – Infrared Astronomical Satellite (IRAS) telescope
- 1984 – IRAM 30-m telescope at Pico Veleta near Granada, Spain completed
- 1987 – 15-m James Clerk Maxwell Telescope UK submillimetre telescope installed at Mauna Kea Observatory
- 1987 – 5-m Swedish-ESO Submillimetre Telescope (SEST) installed at the ESO La Silla Observatory
- 1988 – Australia Telescope Compact Array aperture synthesis radio telescope begins operation, located near Narrabri, Australia
- 1989 – Cosmic Background Explorer (COBE) satellite

==== 1990s ====
- 1990 – Hubble 2.4m space Telescope launched, mirror found to be flawed
- 1991 – Compton Gamma Ray Observatory satellite
- 1993 – Keck 10-meter optical/infrared reflecting telescope begins operation, located at Mauna Kea, Hawaii
- 1993 – Very Long Baseline Array of 10 dishes
- 1995 – Cambridge Optical Aperture Synthesis Telescope (COAST)—the first very high resolution optical astronomical images (from aperture synthesis observations)
- 1995 – Giant Metrewave Radio Telescope of thirty 45 m dishes at Pune
- 1996 – Keck 2 10-meter optical/infrared reflecting telescope begins operation, located at Mauna Kea, Hawaii
- 1997 – The Japanese HALCA satellite begins operations, producing first VLBI observations from space, 25,000 km maximum baseline
- 1998 – First light at VLT1, the 8.2 m ESO telescope

=== 2000s ===
- 2001 – First light at the Keck Interferometer. Single-baseline operations begin in the near-infrared.
- 2001 – First light at VLTI interferometry array. Operations on the interferometer start with single-baseline near-infrared observations with the 103 m baseline.
- 2005 – First imaging with the VLTI using the AMBER optical aperture synthesis instrument and three VLT telescopes.
- 2005 – First light at SALT, the largest optical telescope in the Southern Hemisphere, with a hexagonal primary mirror of 11.1 by 9.8 meters.
- 2007 – First light at Gran Telescopio de Canarias (GTC), in Spain, the largest optical telescope in the world with an effective diameter of 10.4 meters.
- 2021 — James Webb Space Telescope (JWST), was launched 25 December 2021 on an ESA Ariane 5 rocket from Kourou, French Guiana and will succeed the Hubble Space Telescope as NASA's flagship mission in astrophysics.
- 2023 — Euclid, was launched on 1 July 2023 on a Falcon 9 Block 5 rocket from Cape Canaveral, Florida, to study dark matter and energy.
- 2023 — XRISM was launched on 6 September 2023 on a H-IIA rocket to study the formation of the universe and the dark matter.

== Under Construction ==
- Iranian National Observatory 3.4 m (first light planned in 2020)
- Extremely Large Telescope (first light planned in 2027)

== Planned ==
- Public Telescope (PST), German project of astrofactum. Launch was planned for 2019, but the project's website is now defunct and no updates have been provided on the fate of the effort.
- Mid/late-2021 – Science first light of the Vera C. Rubin Observatory is anticipated for 2021 with full science operations to begin a year later.
- Nancy Grace Roman Space Telescope, part of NASA's Exoplanet Exploration Program. Launch is tentatively scheduled for 2027.

== See also ==
- Timeline of telescope technology
- List of largest optical telescopes historically
- Extremely large telescope
