= Samuel Klingenstierna =

Swedish mathematician

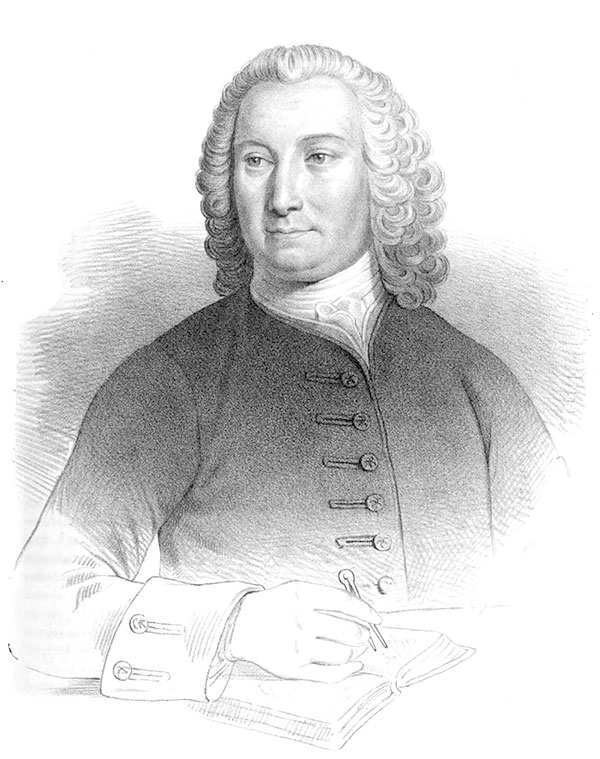

Samuel Klingenstierna (18 August 1698 – 26 October 1765) was a Swedish mathematician and scientist. He started his career as a lawyer but soon moved to natural philosophy. As a student he gave lectures on the then novel mathematical analysis of Newton and Leibniz. Klingenstierna was a professor of geometry at Uppsala University from 1728. In 1750 he moved to physics but retired two years later to become an advisor to the Commander of Artillery. In 1756 he assumed the post of the tutor of the Crown Prince, the future king Gustav III.

He was the first to enunciate errors in Newton's theories of refraction, geometrical notes that John Dollond used in his experiments. Later on he was instrumental in the invention of the Achromatic Telescope. Klingenstierna published in Sweden and in Swedish, and his priority was not recognized.
