= Achromatic telescope =

Refracting telescope design that reduces chromatic aberration

For an achromatic doublet, visible wavelengths have approximately the same focal length.

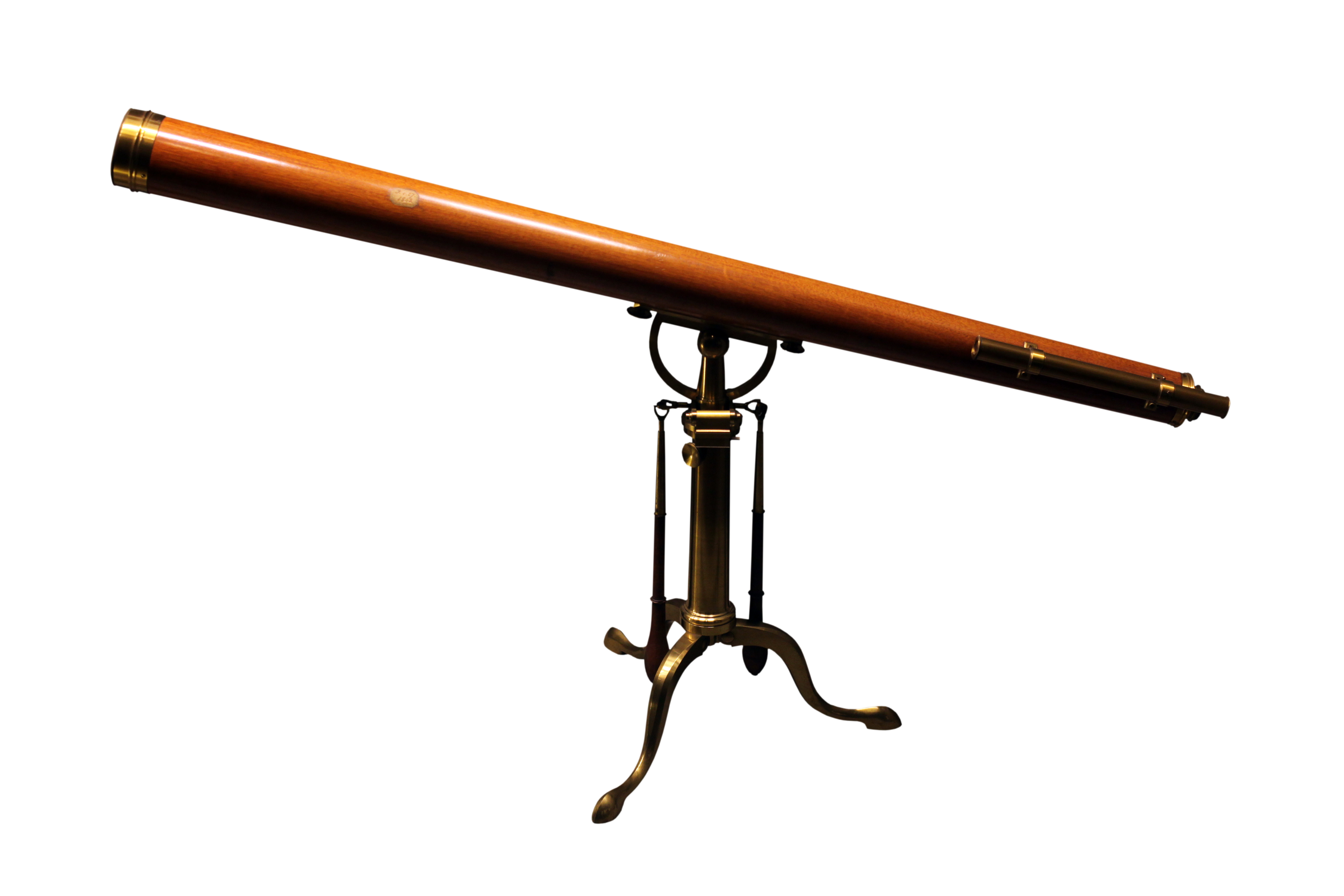
Achromatic telescope by Hooke, 18th century.

The achromatic telescope is a refracting telescope that uses an achromatic lens to correct for chromatic aberration.

== How it works ==
When an image passes through a lens, the light is refracted at different angles for different wavelengths. This reflects focal lengths that are dependent on the color of the light. So, for example, at the focal plane an image may be focused at the red end of the spectrum, but blurred at the blue end. This effect is particularly noticeable the further an object lies from the central axis of the telescope. The image of a star can appear blue on one side and orange on the other. Early refracting telescopes with non-achromatic objectives were constructed with very long focal lengths to mask the chromatic aberration.

An achromatic telescope uses an achromatic lens to correct for this. An achromatic lens is a compound lens made with two types of glass with different dispersion. One element, a concave lens made out of Flint glass, has relatively high dispersion, while the other, a convex element made of Crown glass, has a lower dispersion. The crown lens is usually placed at the front due to the higher susceptibility of flint glass to atmospheric attack (exception: Steinheil doublet).

The lens elements are mounted next to each other and shaped so that the chromatic aberration of one is counterbalanced by the chromatic aberration of the other, while the positive power of the crown lens element is not quite equaled by the negative power of the flint lens element. Together they form a weak positive lens that will bring two different wavelengths of light to a common focus.

== Achromatic telescope designs ==
=== Littrow doublet ===
This uses an equiconvex crown with R1=R2, and a flint with R3=-R2 and a flat back. It can produce a ghost image between R2 and R3 because they have the same radii. It may also produce a ghost image between the flat R4 and rear of the telescope tube.

=== Fraunhofer ===
R1 is set greater than R2, and R2 is set close to, but not equal, R3. R4 is usually greater than R3.

=== Clark doublet ===
This uses an equiconvex crown with R1=R2, and a flint with R3~R2 and R4>>R3. R3 is set slightly shorter than R2 to create a focus mismatch between R2 and R3, thereby reducing ghosting between the crown and flint.

=== Oil spaced doublet ===
The use of oil between the crown and flint eliminates the effect of ghosting, particularly where R2=R3. It can also increase light transmission slightly and reduce the impact of errors in R2 and R3.

=== Steinheil doublet ===
This is a flint-first doublet in need of stronger curvature than, e.g., a Fraunhofer doublet.

== See also ==
- Apochromat
- History of telescopes
- List of telescope types
