= Lippershey (crater) =

Crater on the Moon

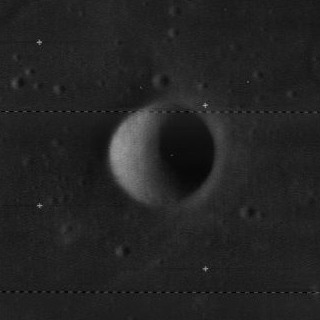
- Lunar Orbiter 4 image
- Coordinates: 25.9°S 10.3°W
- Diameter: 7 km
- Depth: 1.4 km
- Colongitude: 11° at sunrise
- Eponym: Hans Lippershey

Lippershey is a relatively tiny lunar impact crater located in the southeast section of the Mare Nubium. It was named after German-Dutch optician Hans Lippershey. It is a circular, cup-shaped feature surrounded by the lunar mare. Lippershey lies to the northeast of the crater Pitatus.

== Satellite craters ==
By convention these features are identified on lunar maps by placing the letter on the side of the crater midpoint that is the closest to Lippershey.

Lippershey	Latitude	Longitude	Diameter
K	26.7° S	11.4° W	2 km
L	25.7° S	11.7° W	3 km
M	24.3° S	10.9° W	2 km
N	24.5° S	9.5° W	3 km
P	26.3° S	8.3° W	2 km
R	26.6° S	10.1° W	4 km
T	25.2° S	11.1° W	5 km
