= John Dollond =

English optician (1706–1761)

John Dollond FRS
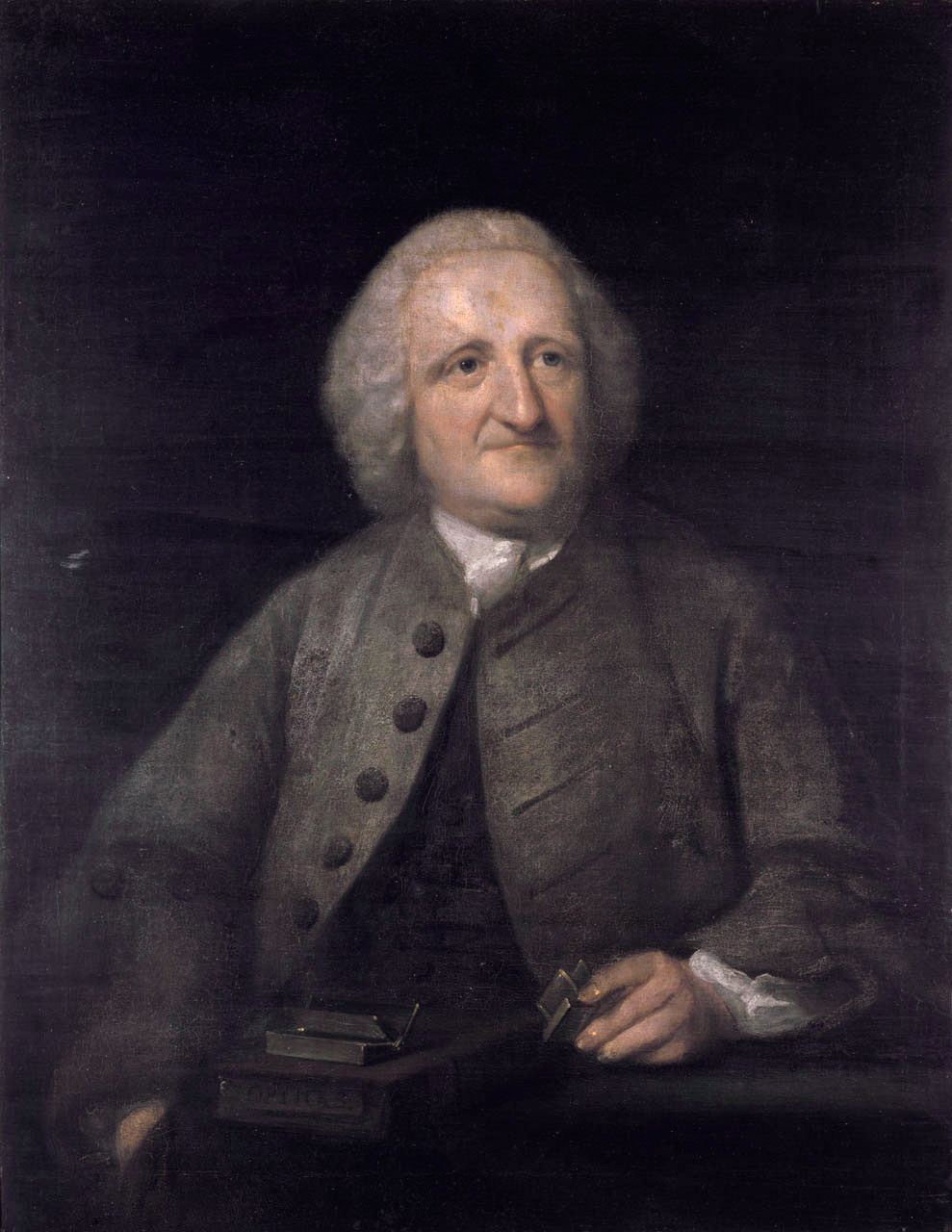
- Portrait by Benjamin Wilson, c. 1760
- Born: 21 June [O.S. 10 June] 1706; London, England
- Died: 30 November 1761 (aged 55); London, England
- Known for: Achromatic doublet
- Spouse: Elizabeth Sommelier (m. 1729)
- Children: 5
- Awards: Copley Medal (1758)
- Scientific career
- Fields: Optics; astronomy

John Dollond FRS (21 June [O.S. 10 June] 1706 – 30 November 1761) was an English optician known for his successful optics business and his patenting and commercialization of achromatic doublets.

== Biography ==
Dollond was the son of a Huguenot refugee, a silk-weaver at Spitalfields, London, where he was born. He followed his father's trade, but found time to acquire a knowledge of Latin, Greek, mathematics, physics, anatomy and other subjects. In 1752 he abandoned silk-weaving and joined his eldest son, Peter Dollond (1731–1820), who in 1750 had started in business as a maker of optical instruments; this business went on to become Dollond & Aitchison. His reputation grew rapidly, and in 1761 he was appointed optician to the king.

In 1758 he published an "Account of some experiments concerning the different refrangibility of light", describing the experiments that led him to the achievement with which his name is specially associated, the discovery of a means of constructing achromatic lenses by the combination of crown and flint glasses, reducing or eliminating chromatic aberration (distortion due to colour fringes). Leonhard Euler in 1747 had suggested that achromatism might be obtained by the combination of glass and water lenses. Relying on statements made by Sir Isaac Newton, Dollond first disputed this possibility (Phil. Trans., 1753), but subsequently, after the Swedish physicist, Samuel Klingenstierna (1698–1765), had pointed out that Newton's law of dispersion did not harmonize with certain observed facts, Dollond began experiments to settle the question.

Early in 1757 Dollond succeeded in producing achromatic refraction by the aid of glass and water lenses, and a few months later he made a successful attempt to get the same result by a combination of glasses of different qualities (see History of telescopes). For this achievement the Royal Society awarded him the Copley Medal in 1758, and three years later elected him one of its fellows. Dollond also published two papers on apparatus for measuring small angles (Phil. Trans., 1753, 1754).

In 1761, Dollond became the optician of King George III. He died of apoplexy on 30 November, of that year in London.

Mr Dolland’s appearance was somewhat stern, and his address and language impressive; but his manners were cheerful, kind and affable. He adhered to the religion of his father, and attended the French Protestant Church, of which his life and conversation rendered him an ornament.

== Family ==
He married Elizabeth Sommelier in 1729. They had two sons and three daughters. Their daughter, Sarah Dollond, married his neighbour and friend, the mathematician and instrument maker Jesse Ramsden.

== Priority of invention ==
Dollond patented the achromatic doublet, which combines crown glass and flint glass.

A theoretical approach to reduce chromatic aberration was worked out by Leonhard Euler in papers that he published in the Memoires of the Berlin Academy between 1747 and 1753. John Dollond read the paper and conducted experiments to construct an achromatic lens and was the first person to patent the achromatic doublet which was granted on 19 April 1758 for a period of 14 years. However, he was not the first to make such lenses. Optician George Bass, following the instructions of Chester Moore Hall, made and sold such lenses as early as 1733. In the late 1750s, Bass told Dollond about Hall's design; Dollond saw the potential and was able to reproduce them.

Dollond appears to have known of the prior work and refrained from enforcing his patent. After his death, his son, Peter, did take action to enforce the patent. A number of his competitors, including Bass, Benjamin Martin, Robert Rew and Jesse Ramsden, took action. Dollond's patent was upheld, as the court found that the patent was valid due to Dollond's exploitation of the invention while prior inventors did not. Several of the opticians were ruined by the expense of the legal proceedings and closed their shops as a result. The patent remained valid until it expired in 1772. Following the expiry of the patent, the price of achromatic doublets in England dropped by half.

== See also ==
- Dollond & Aitchison
- List of astronomical instrument makers
