= Vacuum evaporation =

Causing boiling at lower temperature via lower pressure

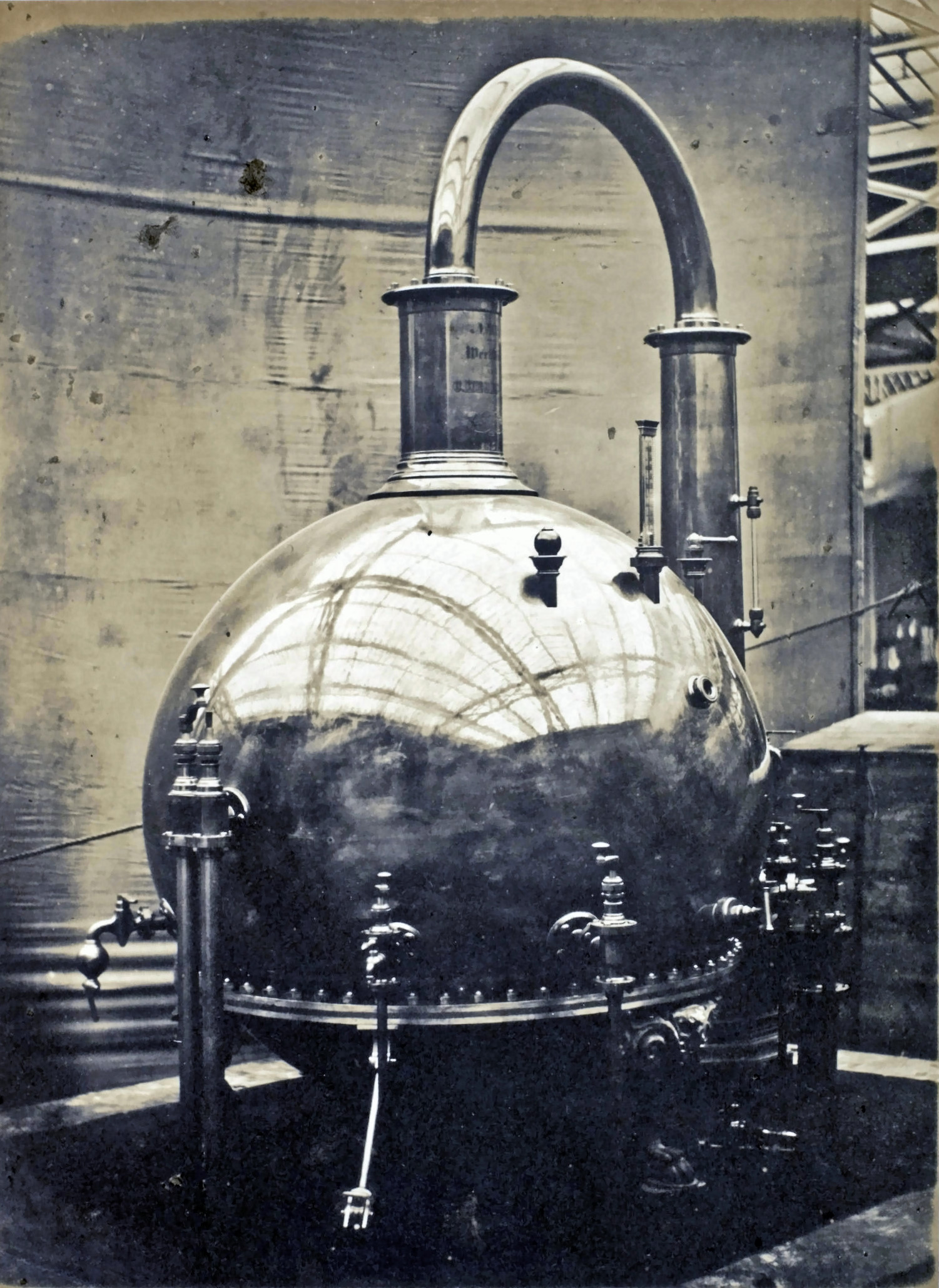
Vacuum Sugar Apparatus at The Great Exhibition, 1851

Vacuum evaporation is the process of causing the pressure in a liquid-filled container to be reduced below the vapor pressure of the liquid, causing the liquid to evaporate at a lower temperature than normal. Although the process can be applied to any type of liquid at any vapor pressure, it is generally used to describe the boiling of water by lowering the container's internal pressure below standard atmospheric pressure and causing the water to boil at room temperature.

The vacuum evaporation treatment process consists of reducing the interior pressure of the evaporation chamber below atmospheric pressure. This reduces the boiling point of the liquid to be evaporated, thereby reducing or eliminating the need for heat in both the boiling and condensation processes. There are other advantages, such as the ability to distill liquids with high boiling points and avoiding decomposition of substances that are heat sensitive.

== Application ==
=== Food ===
When the process is applied to food and the water is evaporated and removed, the food can be stored for long periods without spoiling. It is also used when boiling a substance at normal temperatures would chemically change the consistency of the product, such as egg whites coagulating when attempting to dehydrate the albumen into a powder.

This process was invented by Henri Nestlé in 1866, of Nestlé Chocolate fame, although the Shakers were already using a vacuum pan before that (see condensed milk).

This process is used industrially to make such food products as evaporated milk for milk chocolate and tomato paste for ketchup.

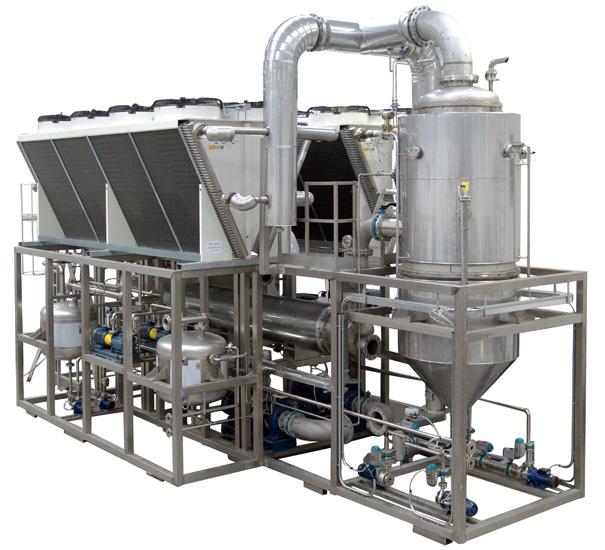
Vacuum evaporation plant

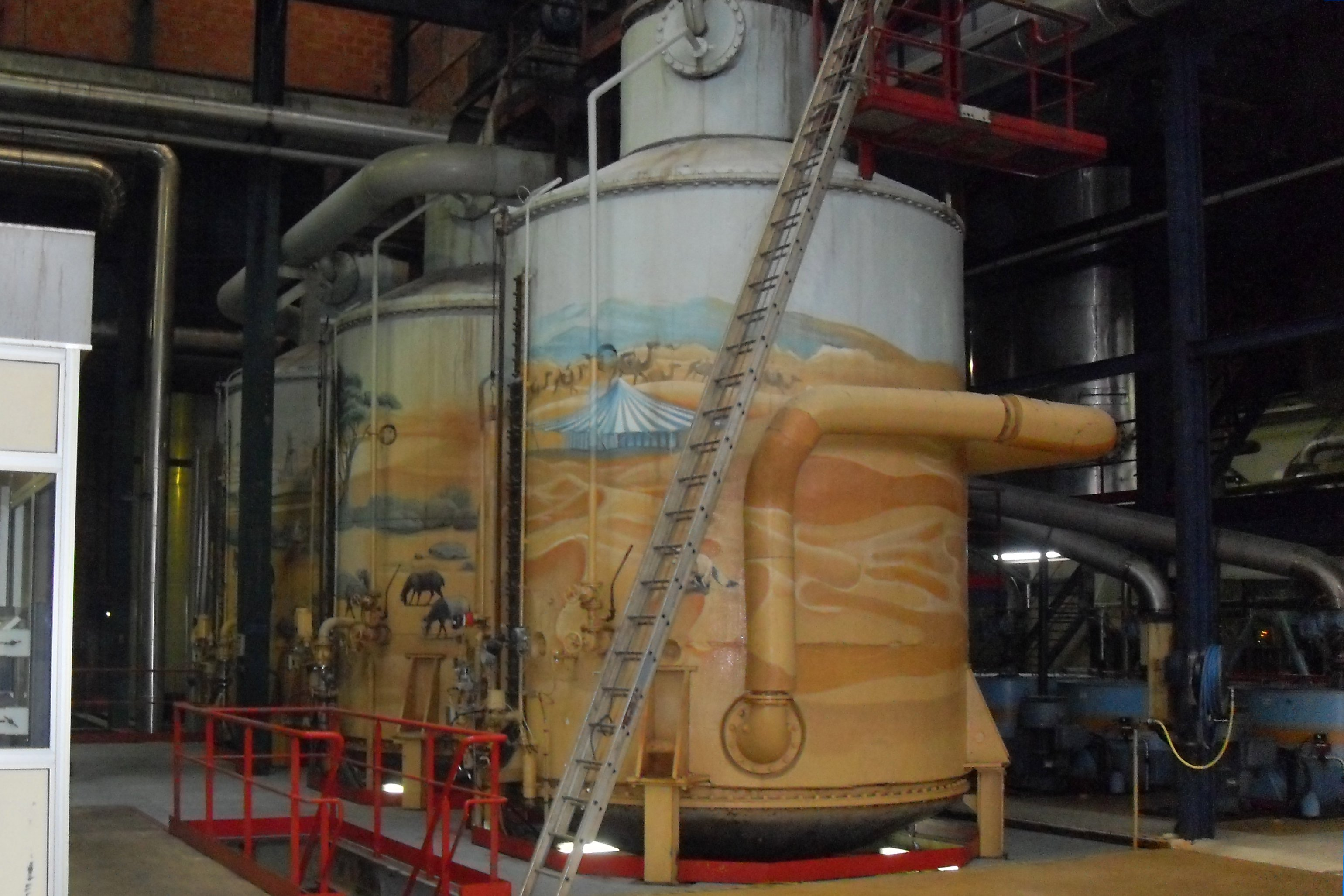
vacuum pans in a beet sugar factory

In the sugar industry vacuum evaporation is used in the crystallization of sucrose solutions. Traditionally this process was performed in batch mode, but nowadays continuous vacuum pans are available.

=== Wastewater treatment ===
Vacuum evaporators are used in a wide range of industrial sectors to treat industrial wastewater. It represents a clean, safe and very versatile technology with low management costs, which in most cases serves as a zero-discharge treatment system.

=== Thin film deposition ===
Vacuum evaporation is also a form of physical vapor deposition used in the semiconductor, microelectronics, and optical industries. In this context it is used to deposit thin films of material onto surfaces. Such a technique consists of pumping a vacuum chamber to low pressures (<10^{−5} torr) and heating a material to produce vapor to deposit the material onto a cold surface. The material to be vaporized is typically heated until its vapor pressure is high enough to produce a flux of several Angstroms per second by using an electrically resistive heater or bombardment by a high voltage beam.

=== Electronics ===
Thermal evaporation has been investigated for the production of organic light-emitting diodes (OLEDs) and organic photovoltaic cells. In organic photovoltaic cells, the purity of the organic semiconductor layers influences the device's energy conversion efficiency and stability.

== See also ==
- Freeze drying
- List of waste-water treatment technologies
- Vacuum deposition
