= Chester Moore Hall =

British lawyer and inventor

Chester Moore Hall (9 December 1703, Leigh, Essex, England – 17 March 1771, Sutton) was a British lawyer and inventor who produced the first achromatic lenses in 1729 or 1733 (accounts differ). He used the achromatic lens to build the first achromatic telescope, a refracting telescope free from chromatic aberration (colour distortion).

He lived at New Hall, Sutton.

His name was also spelled Chester Moor Hall and Chester More Hall.

The design had two elements, a crown and flint glass, that brought two wavelengths of light to a focus.

Chester is noted as having made the first twin color corrected lens in 1730.

== See also ==
- List of largest optical telescopes in the 18th century
- John Dollond (also developed achromats in the 1750s)
