= Hans Lipperhey =

German-Dutch lens crafter (1570–1619)

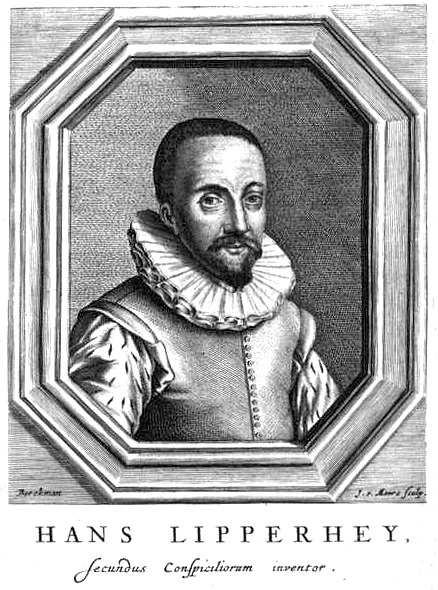
- Born: c. 1570; Wesel, Duchy of Cleves, Holy Roman Empire
- Died: September 1619 (aged 48–49); Middelburg, Dutch Republic
- Occupation: spectacle-maker
- Known for: Earliest known patent application for a telescope

Hans Lipperhey (Note: German pronunciation: [hans ˈlɪpɐhaɪ], Dutch pronunciation: [ɦɑns ˈlɪpərɦɛi].) (c. 1570 – buried 29 September 1619), also known as Johann Lippershey or simply Lippershey, (Note: Originally a misspelling found in an English translation from 1831, Lippershey is pronounced /ˈlɪpərʃi/ LIP-ər-shee.) was a German-Dutch spectacle-maker. He is commonly associated with the invention of the telescope, because he was the first one who tried to obtain a patent for it. It is, however, unclear if he was the first one to build a telescope.

== Biography ==
Lipperhey was born in Wesel, now in western Germany, around 1570. He settled in Middelburg, the capital of the province of Zeeland, now in the Netherlands, in 1594, married the same year and became a citizen of Zeeland in 1602. During that time he became a master lens grinder and spectacle maker and established a shop. He remained in Middelburg until his death, in September 1619.

=== Invention of the telescope ===
Hans Lipperhey is known for the earliest written record of a refracting telescope, a patent he filed in 1608. His work with optical devices grew out of his work as a spectacle maker, an industry that had started in Venice and Florence in the thirteenth century, and later expanded to the Netherlands and Germany.

Lipperhey applied to the States General of the Netherlands on 2 October 1608 for a patent for his instrument "for seeing things far away as if they were nearby", a few weeks before another Dutch instrument-maker's patent, that of Jacob Metius. Lipperhey failed to receive a patent since the same claim for invention had also been made by other spectacle-makers, but he was handsomely rewarded by the Dutch government for copies of his design.

Lipperhey's application for a patent was mentioned at the end of a diplomatic report on an embassy to Holland from the Kingdom of Siam sent by the Siamese king Ekathotsarot: Ambassades du Roy de Siam envoyé à l'Excellence du Prince Maurice, arrivé à La Haye le 10 Septemb. 1608 (Embassy of the King of Siam sent to his Excellency Prince Maurice, arrived at The Hague on 10 September 1608). This report was issued in October 1608 and distributed across Europe, leading to experiments by other scientists, such as the Italian Paolo Sarpi, who received the report in November, the Englishman Thomas Harriot, who was using a six-powered telescope by the summer of 1609, and Galileo Galilei, who improved the device.

There are many stories as to how Lipperhey came by his invention. One version has Lipperhey observing two children playing with lenses in his shop and commenting how they could make a far away weather-vane seem closer when looking at it through two lenses. Other stories have Lipperhey's apprentice coming up with the idea or have Lipperhey copying someone else's discovery. Lipperhey's original instrument consisted of either two convex lenses with an inverted image or a convex objective and a concave eyepiece lens so it would have an upright image. This "Dutch perspective glass" (the name "telescope" would not be coined until three years later by Giovanni Demisiani) had a three-times (or 3×) magnification.

The lunar crater Lippershey, the minor planet 31338 Lipperhey, and the exoplanet Lipperhey (55 Cancri Ad) are named after him.

== Sources ==
- Drake, Stillman (1978). Galileo At Work. Mineola, New York: Dover. ISBN 0-486-49542-6.
- Van Helden, Albert (1977). The Invention of the Telescope. Philadelphia, Pennsylvania: The American Philosophical Society. ISBN 0-87169-674-6.
- Van Helden, Albert (1985). Measuring the Universe. Chicago, Illinois: The University of Chicago Press. ISBN 0-226-84881-7.
- Moll, G. (1831). "On the first Invention of Telescopes". Journal of the Royal Institution. 1: 319–332, 483–496. This is a shortened English version of Moll's article
- "Historical research into the first inventors of the binoculars, compiled from the notes of the late professor J.H. van Swinden". New Dissertations of the Royal Dutch Institute. 3: 103–209. 1831. In the English version, Moll mistakenly uses the spelling 'Lippershey', with an 's'. Through this English article this spelling has unfortunately become common in English literature.
