= Giovanni Demisiani =

Greek theologian, chemist and mathematician

- Born: unknown Zakynthos
- Died: 1614
- Known for: Lincean, naming the Telescope.
- Scientific career
- Fields: Mathematics, chemistry

Giovanni Demisiani (Greek: Ἰωάννης Δημησιάνος; died 1614), a Greek from Zakynthos, was a theologian, chemist, mathematician to Cardinal Gonzaga, and member of the Accademia dei Lincei. Demisiani is noted for coining the name telescope (from the Greek τῆλε, tele "far" and σκοπεῖν, skopein "to look or see") for a version of the instrument presented by Galileo Galilei to the Accademia dei Lincei at a banquet honoring Galileo's induction into the Accademia in 1611.

== See also ==
- List of Greek mathematicians
