= IC 1623 =

Galaxy pair in the constellation Cetus

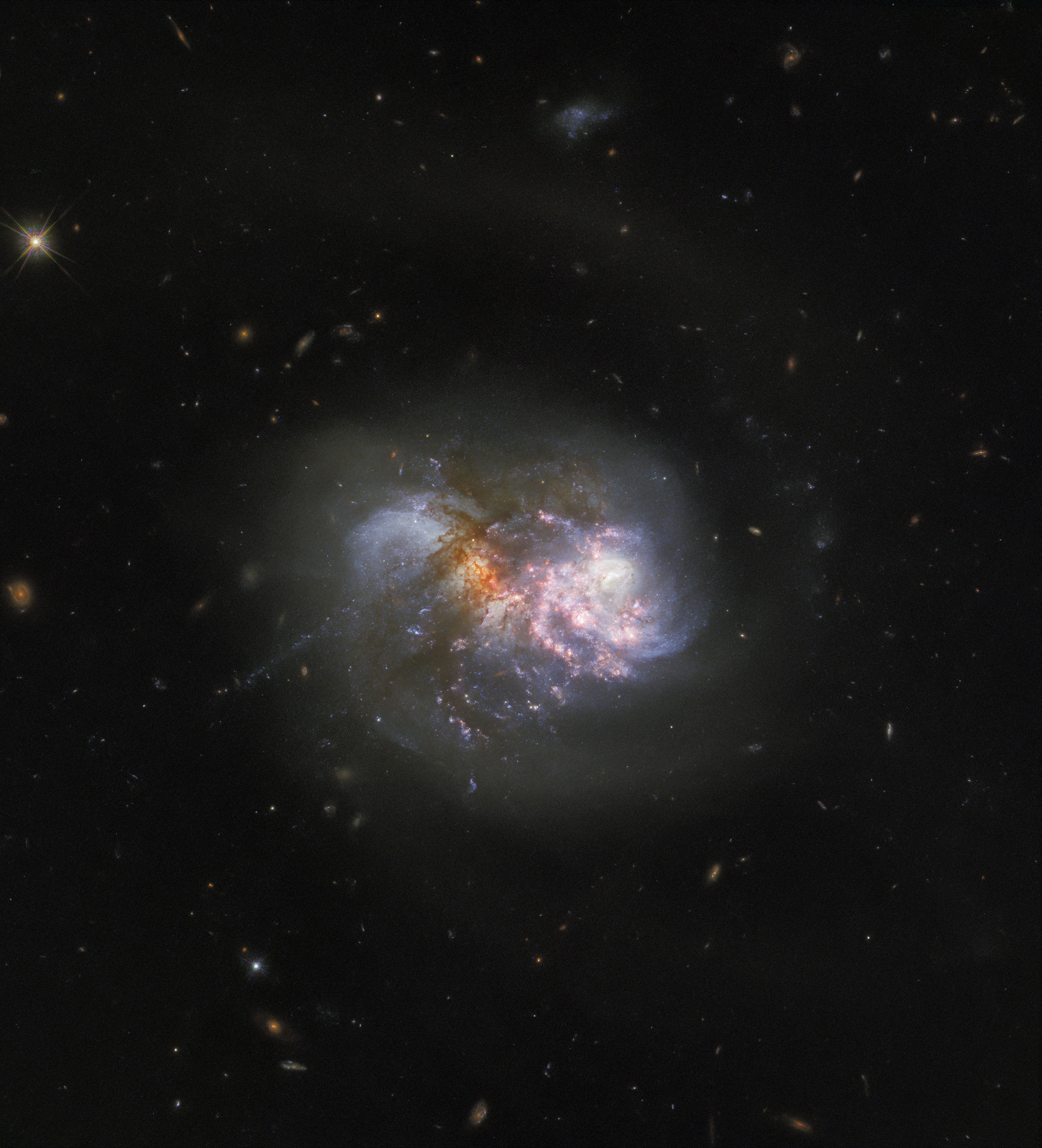
- IC 1623 by Hubble Space Telescope

Observation data (J2000 epoch)
- Constellation: Cetus
- Right ascension: 01^{h} 07^{m} 47.2^{s}
- Declination: −17° 30′ 25″
- Redshift: 0.020067 ± 0.000077
- Heliocentric radial velocity: 6,016 ± 23 km/s
- Distance: 254 Mly (78 Mpc)
- Apparent magnitude (V): 13.9

Characteristics
- Apparent size (V): 1.5′ × 1.2′
- Notable features: Galaxy merger, luminous infrared galaxy

Other designations
- Arp 236, ESO 541-IG 023, VV 114, IRAS 1053-1746, PGC 4007/4008/4009

IC 1623 is a galaxy merger in the constellation Cetus. The galaxy lies about 250 million light years away from Earth, which means, given its apparent dimensions, that IC 1623 is approximately 115,000 light years across. It was discovered by Lewis Swift on November 19, 1897.

== Characteristics ==
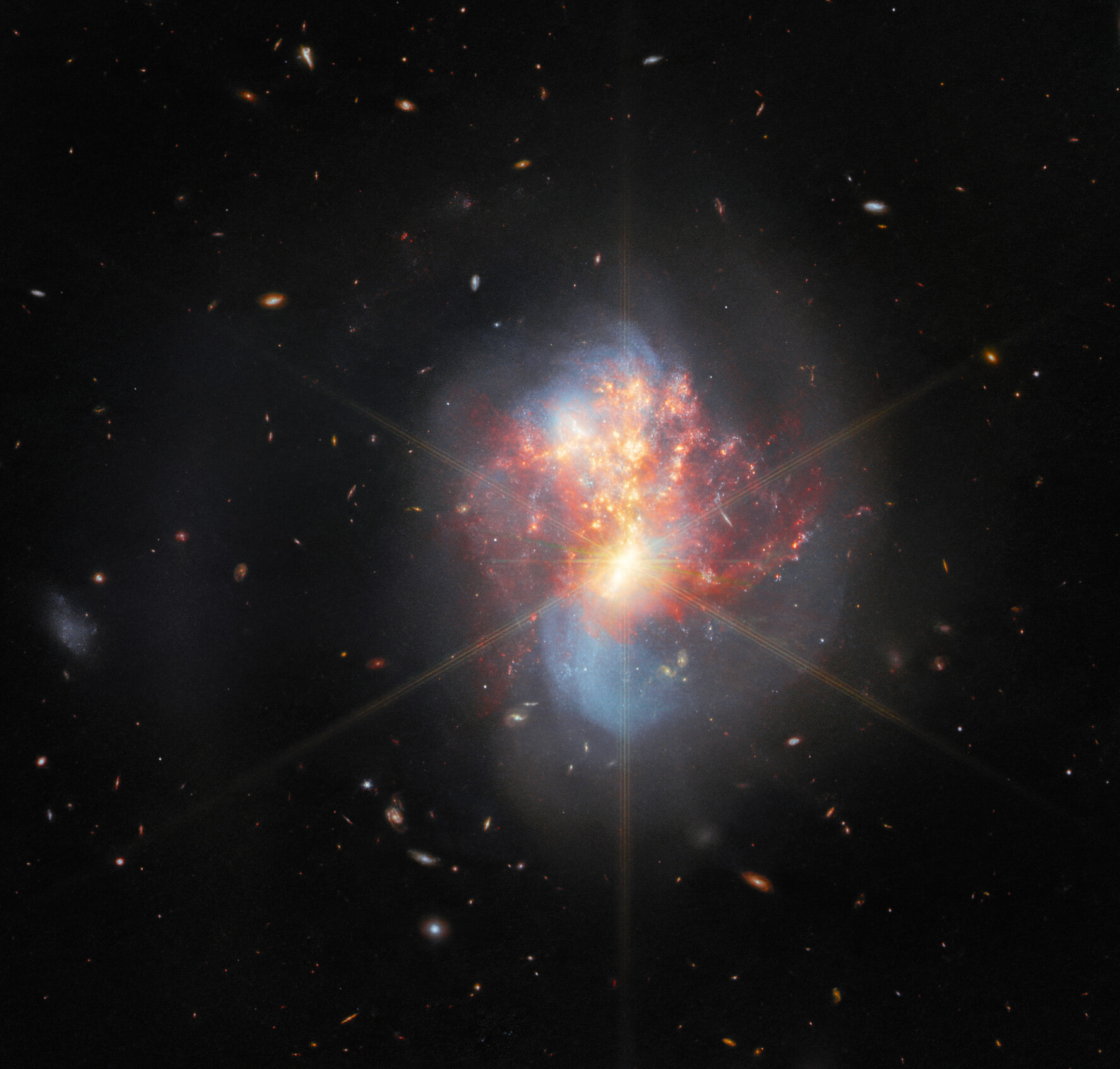
IC 1623 by the James Webb Space Telescope. The luminous core of the galaxy merger turns out to be both very bright and highly compact, so much so that diffraction spikes appear atop the galaxy in this image.

IC 1623 consists of two galaxies in the early to mid stages of merger. The nuclei of the two galaxies lie 20 arcseconds apart. The western component (VV 114W) is bright in ultraviolet and optical light and hosts a large number of optically luminous young star clusters. The eastern component, VV 114E, is invisible at UV wavelengths and has prominent dust lanes that cover much of the diffuse light of the underlying stellar population at optical wavelengths. Beyond 1 μm, VV 114E increasingly becomes the dominant luminosity component of the merger, being the brightest source in mid infrared. The whole galaxy shines bright in infrared and it is characterised as a luminous infrared galaxy, with a total infrared luminosity (L_{IR}) of 5 × 10^{11} L⊙.

The James Webb Space Telescope (JWST) observed the nucleus of the eastern galaxy in mid-infrared, revealing a northeastern and a southwestern core. The mid-infrared colors of these cores indicate that the northeastern core is associated with a starburst, while the southwestern core is linked to an active galactic nucleus (AGN). Spectral line analysis suggests the presence of a rapidly accreting intermediate-mass black hole in the southwestern nucleus, which may evolve into a supermassive black hole. Additionally, JWST identified 40 star-forming regions with a total star formation rate ranging from 0.02 to 6 solar masses per year. There is also significant diffuse emission from filaments, primarily attributed to polycyclic aromatic hydrocarbons heated by the star-forming regions and the underlying stellar population.
