= Diffraction spike =

Lines radiating from bright light sources in photographs

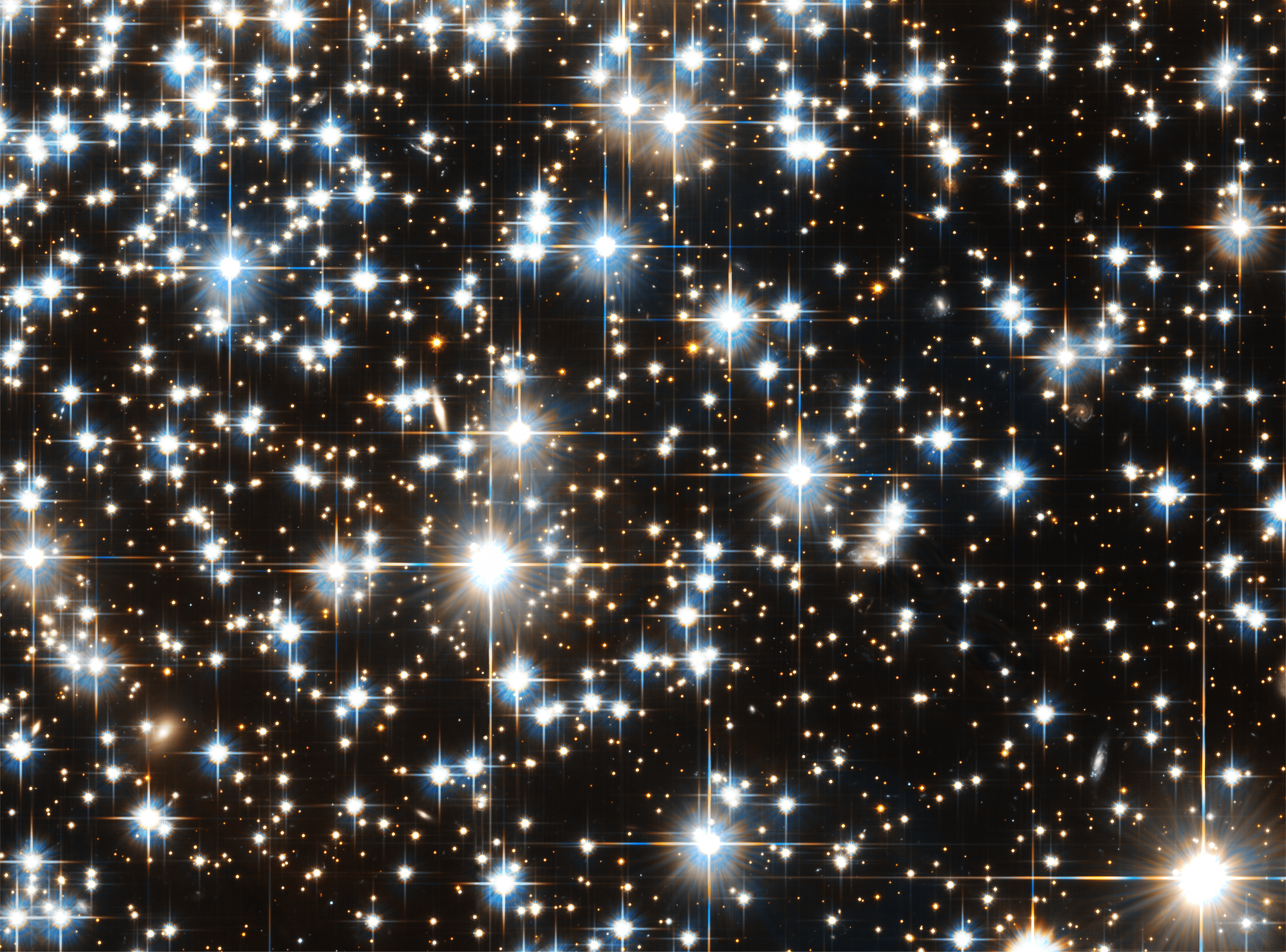
Diffraction spikes from various stars seen on an image taken by the Hubble Space Telescope

Diffraction spikes are lines radiating from bright light sources, causing what is known as the starburst effect or sunstars in photographs and in vision. They are artifacts caused by light diffracting around the support vanes of the secondary mirror in reflecting telescopes, or edges of non-circular camera apertures, and around eyelashes and eyelids in the eye.

While similar in appearance, this is a different effect to "vertical smear" or "blooming" that appears when bright light sources are captured by a charge-coupled device (CCD) image sensor.

== Causes ==
=== Support vanes ===
Comparison of diffraction spikes for various strut arrangements of a reflecting telescope. The inner circle represents the secondary mirror.

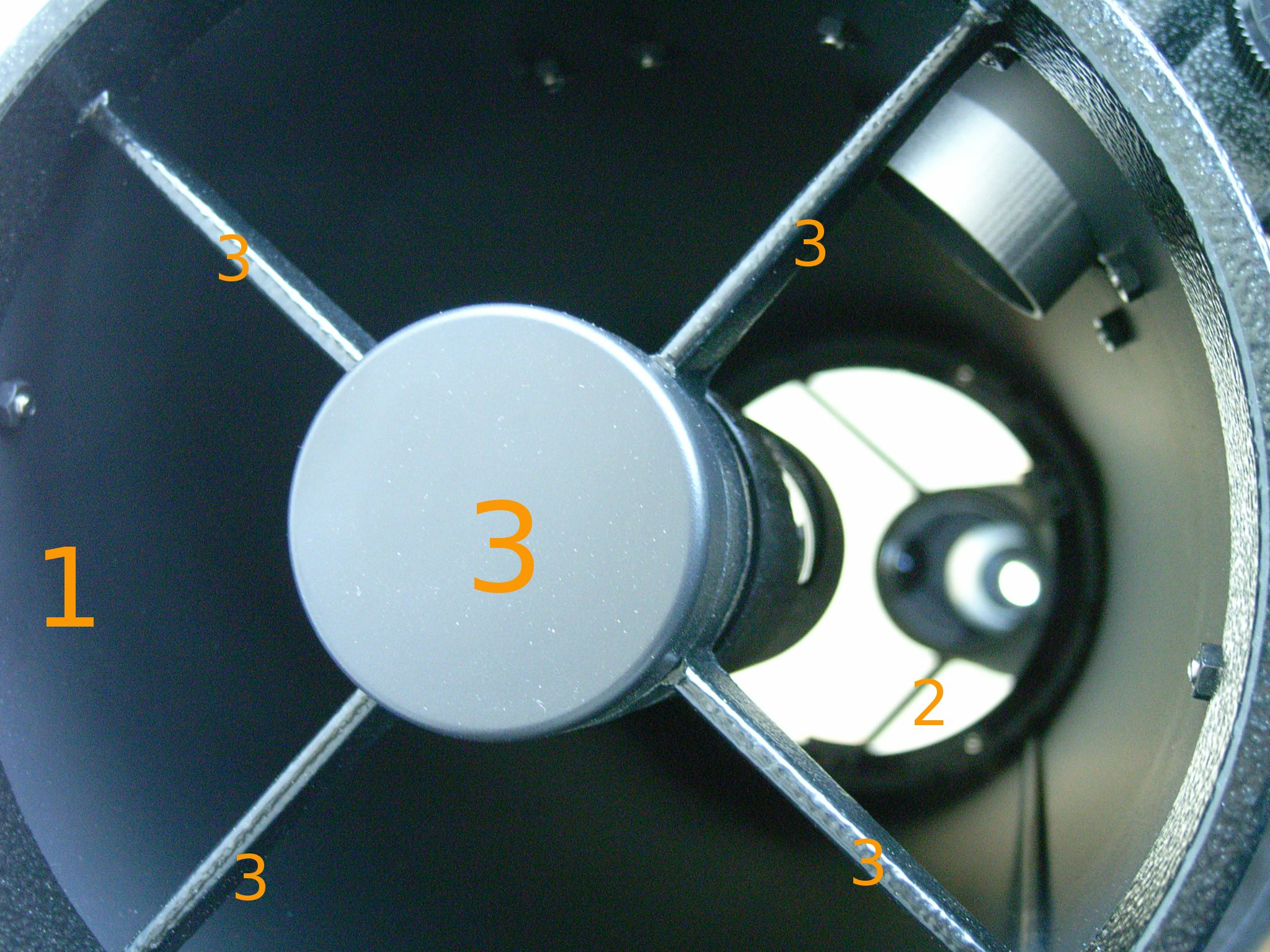
The optics of a Newtonian reflector telescope with four spider vanes supporting the secondary mirror.

In the vast majority of reflecting telescope designs, the secondary mirror has to be positioned at the central axis of the telescope and so has to be held by struts within the telescope tube. No matter how fine these support rods are, they diffract the incoming light from a subject star. This appears as diffraction spikes, which are the Fourier transform of the support struts. The spikes represent a loss of light that could have been used to image the star.

Although diffraction spikes can obscure parts of a photograph and are undesired in professional contexts, some amateur astronomers like the visual effect they give to bright stars – the "Star of Bethlehem" appearance – and even modify their refractors to exhibit the same effect, or to assist with focusing when using a CCD.

A small number of reflecting telescopes designs avoid diffraction spikes by placing the secondary mirror off-axis. Early off-axis designs such as the Herschelian and the Schiefspiegler telescopes have serious limitations such as astigmatism and long focal ratios, which make them useless for research. The brachymedial design by Ludwig Schupmann, which uses a combination of mirrors and lenses, is able to correct chromatic aberration perfectly over a small area and designs based on the Schupmann brachymedial are currently used for research of double stars.

There are also a small number of off-axis unobstructed all-reflecting anastigmats which give optically perfect images.

Refracting telescopes and their photographic images do not have the same problem as their lenses are not supported with spider vanes.

=== Segmented mirrors ===
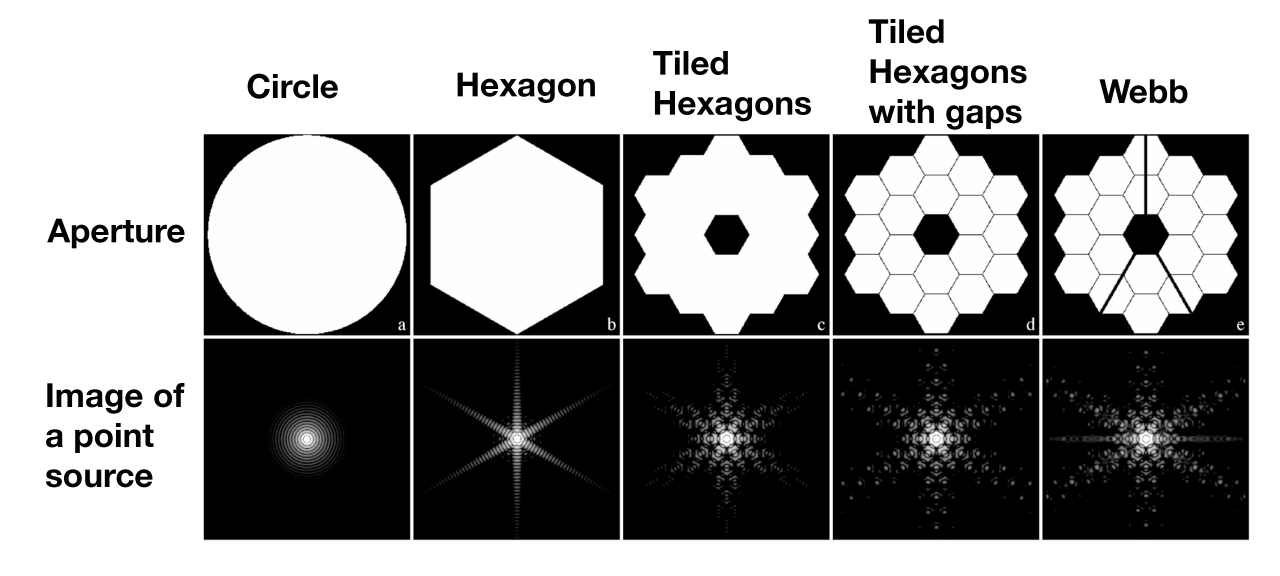
Diffraction spikes caused in JWST due to its hexagonal aperture and three support struts

Edges of the JWST primary mirror segments and spider colour-coded with their corresponding diffraction spikes

Images from telescopes with segmented mirrors also exhibit diffraction spikes due to diffraction from the mirrors' edges. As before, two spikes are perpendicular to each edge orientation, resulting in six spikes (plus two fainter ones due to the spider supporting the secondary mirror) in photographs taken by the James Webb Space Telescope.

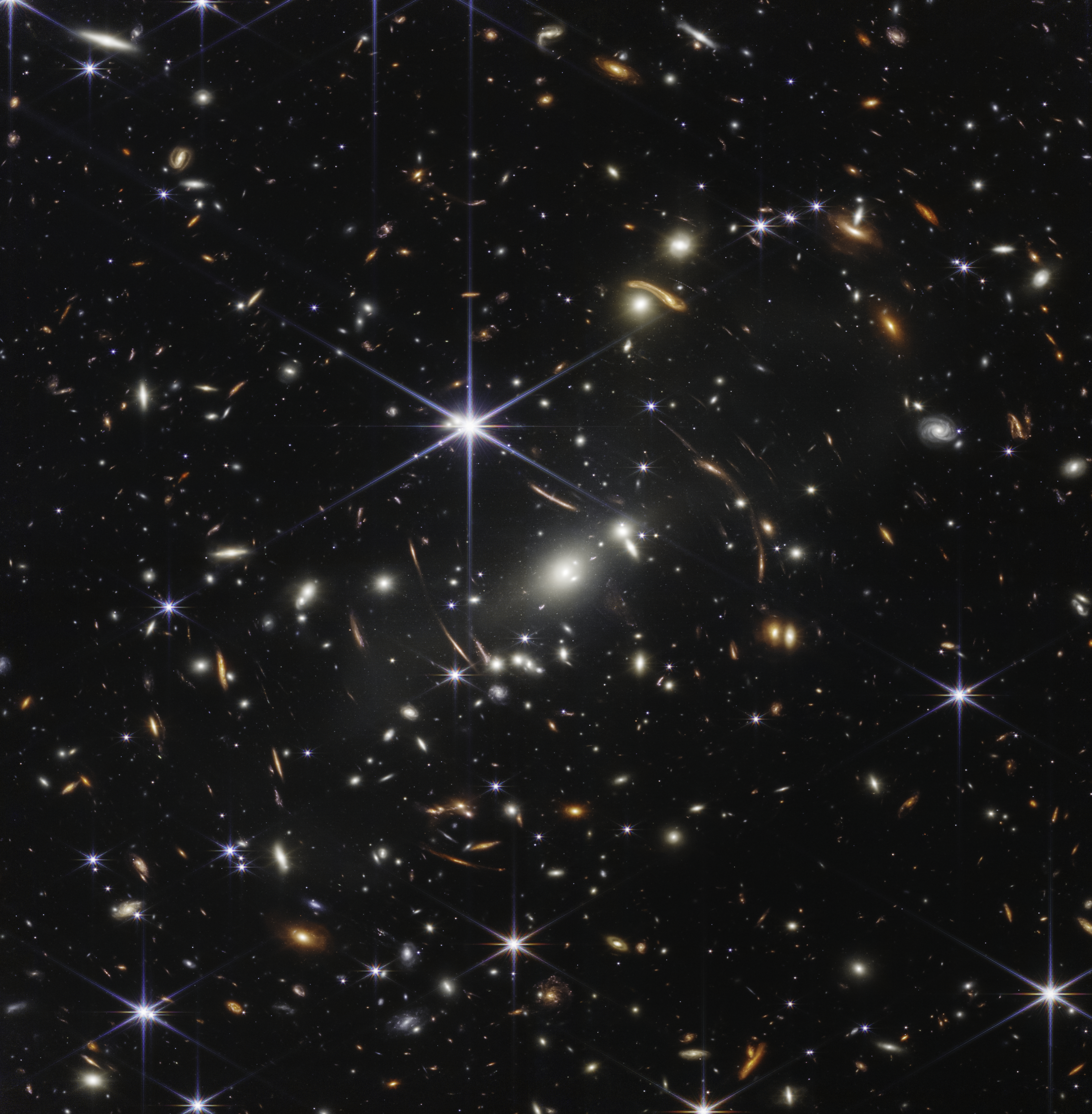
The first JWST deep field with diffraction spikes

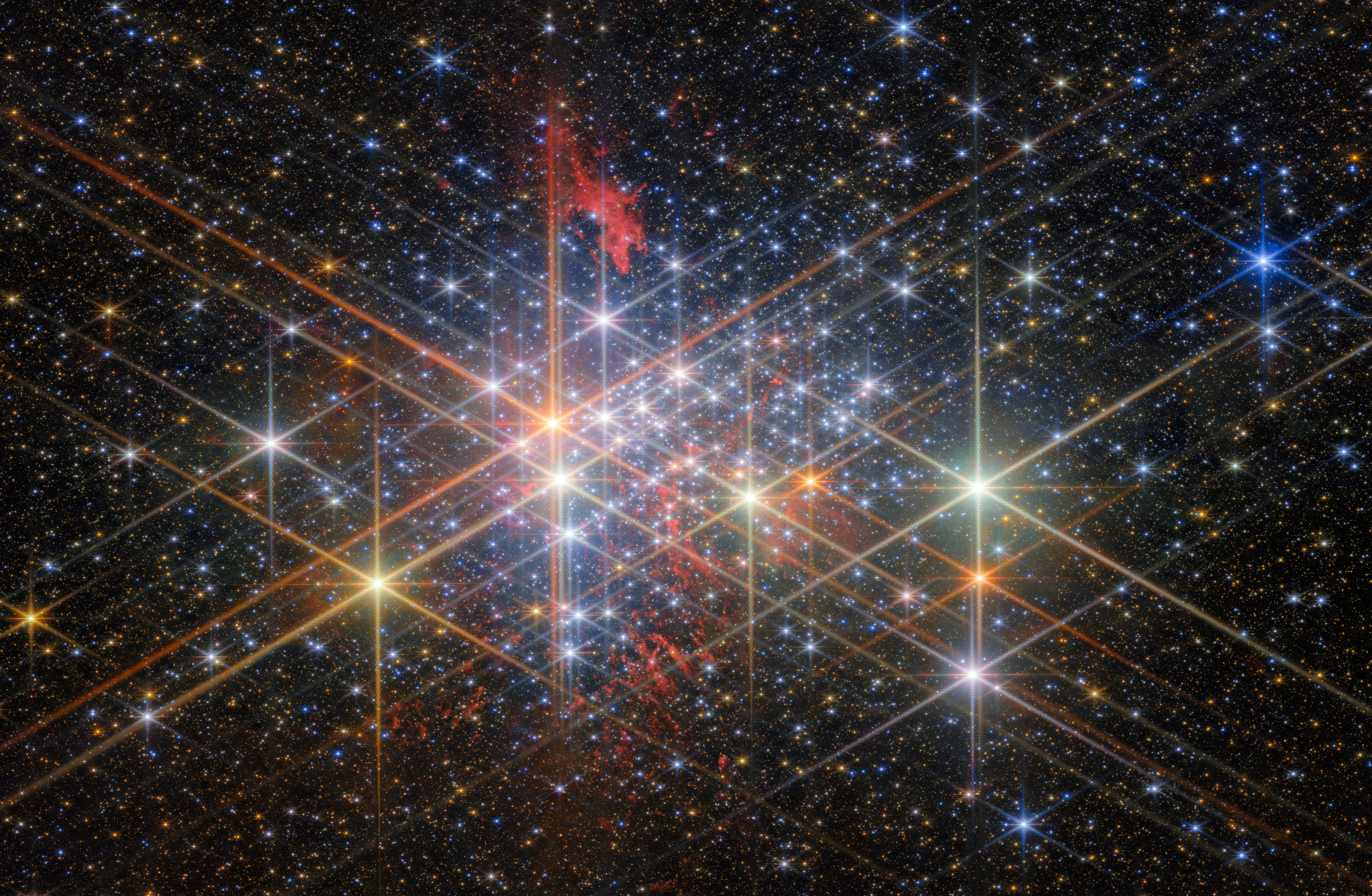
JWST image of star cluster Westerlund 1 with diffraction spikes

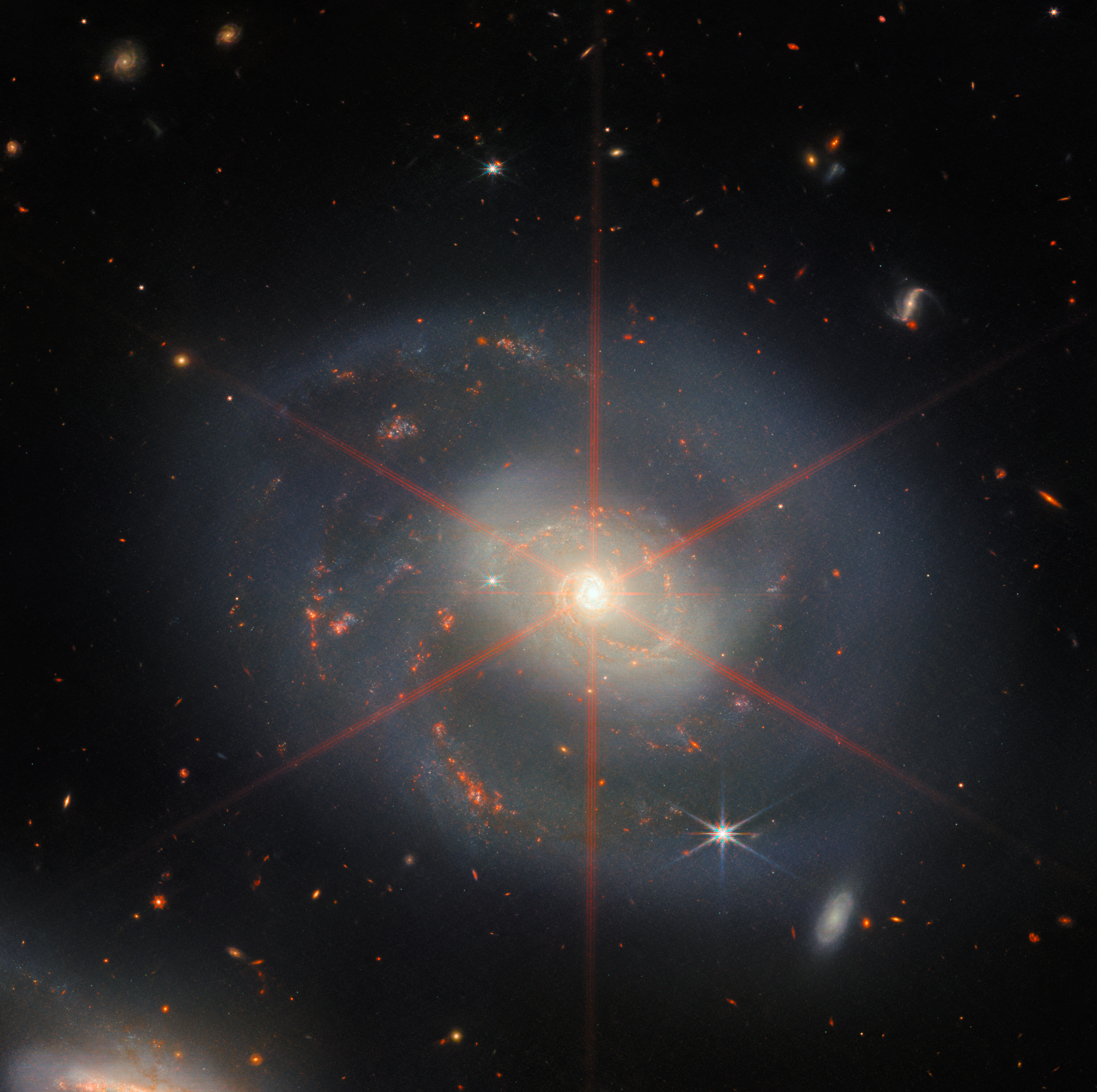
JWST image of the spiral galaxy NGC 7469 with diffraction spikes

=== Non-circular aperture ===
Comparison of diffraction spikes for apertures of different shapes and blade count

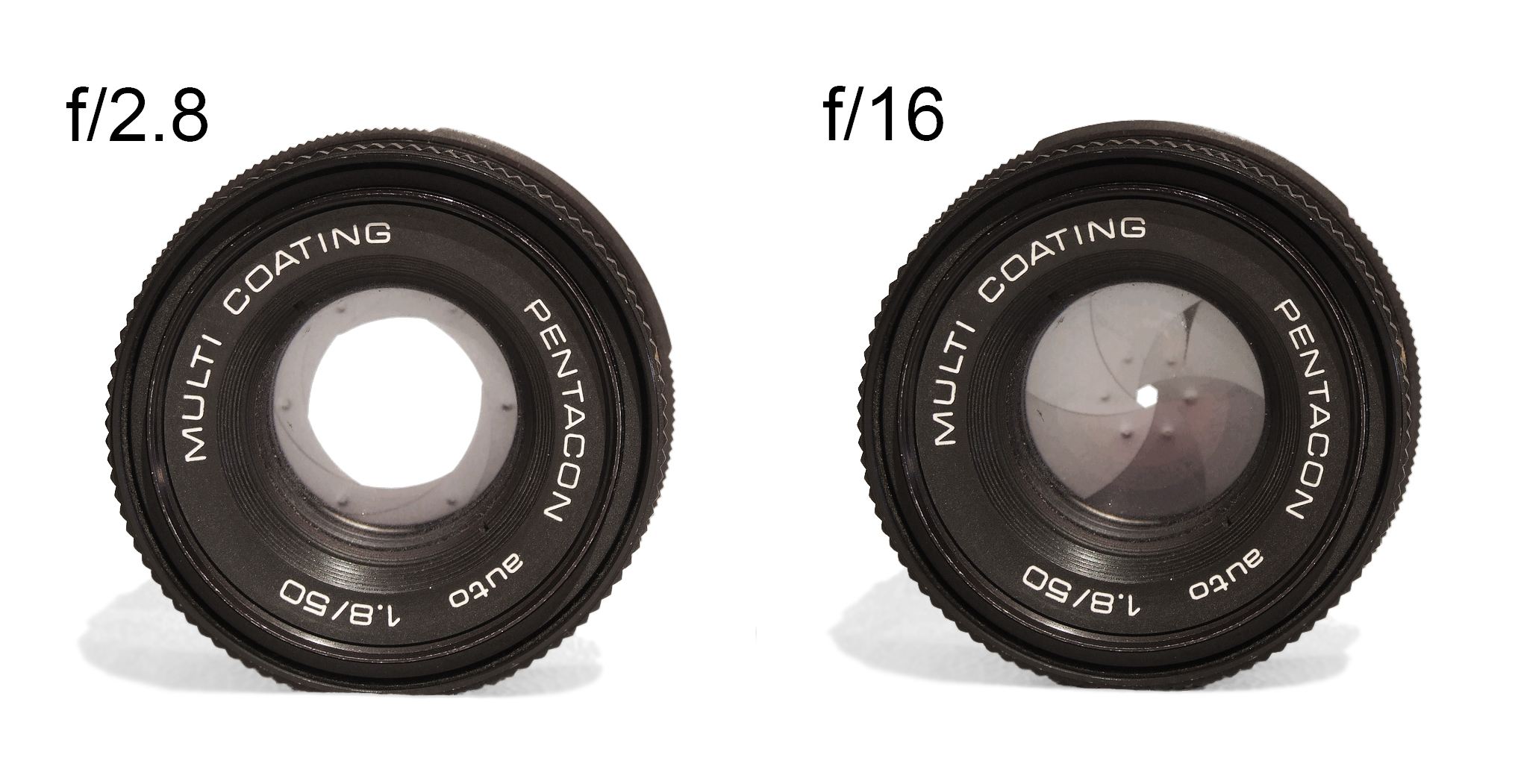
Camera aperture blades

Iris diaphragms with moving blades are used in most modern camera lenses to restrict the light received by the film or sensor. While manufacturers attempt to make the aperture circular for a pleasing bokeh, when stopped down to high f-numbers (small apertures), its shape tends towards a polygon with the same number of sides as blades. Diffraction spreads out light waves passing through the aperture perpendicular to the roughly-straight edge, each edge yielding two spikes 180° apart. As the blades are uniformly distributed around the circle, on a diaphragm with an even number of blades, the diffraction spikes from blades on opposite sides overlap. Consequently, a diaphragm with n blades yields n spikes if n is even, and 2n spikes if n is odd.

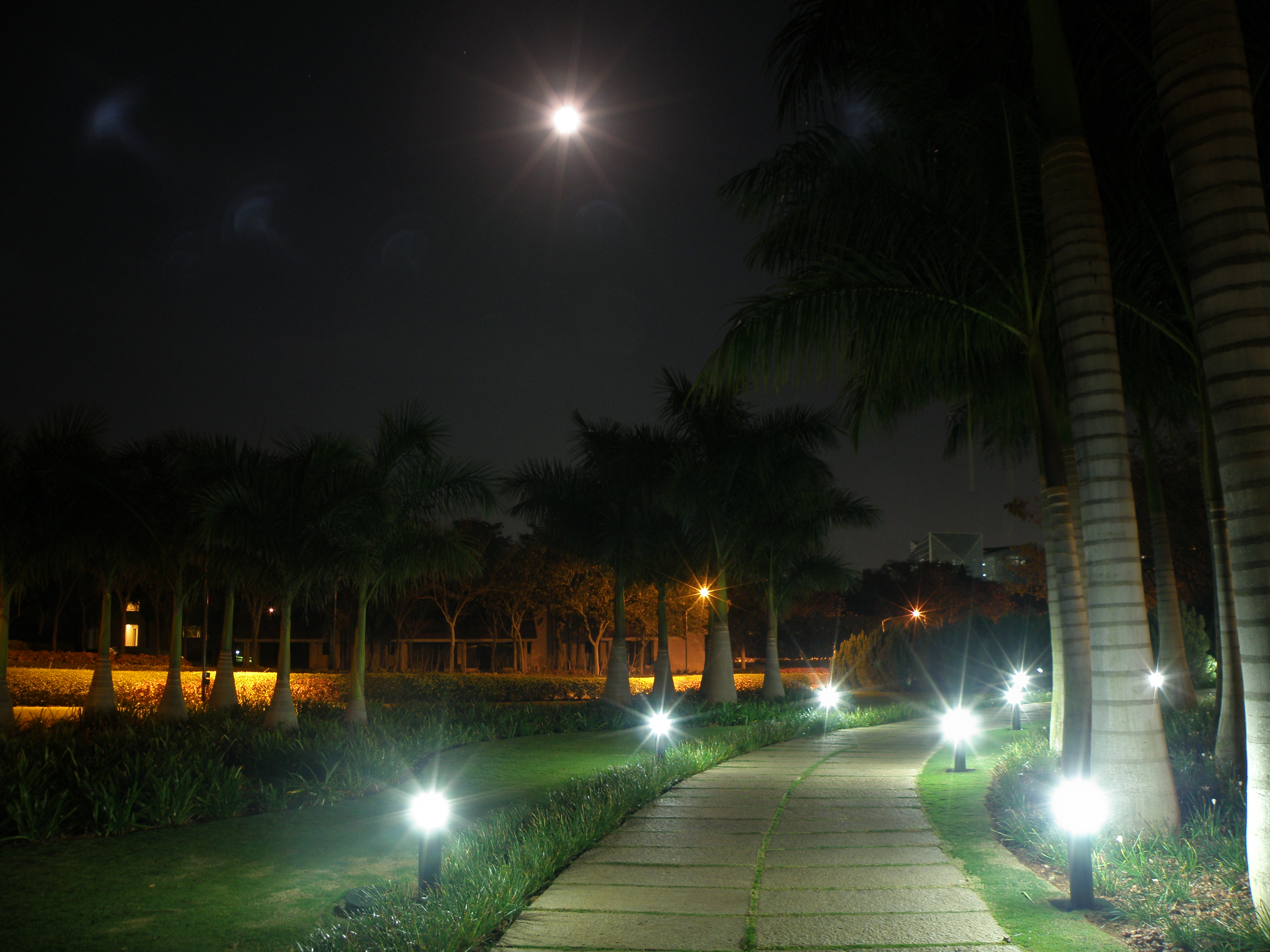
5 blades giving 10 spikes

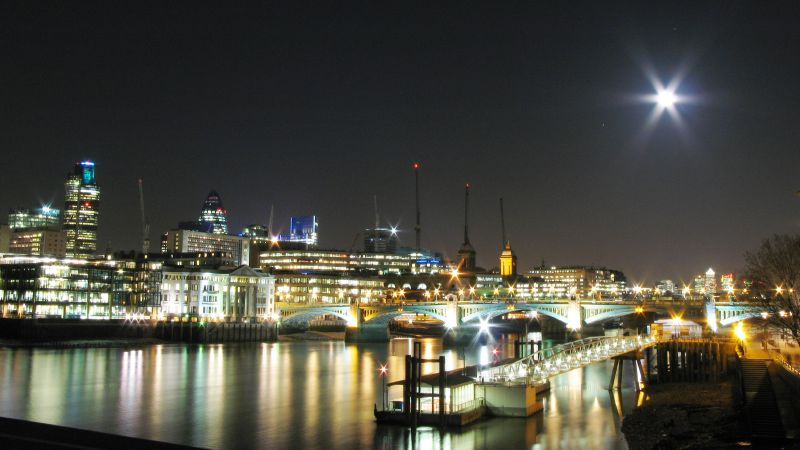
6 blades giving 6 spikes

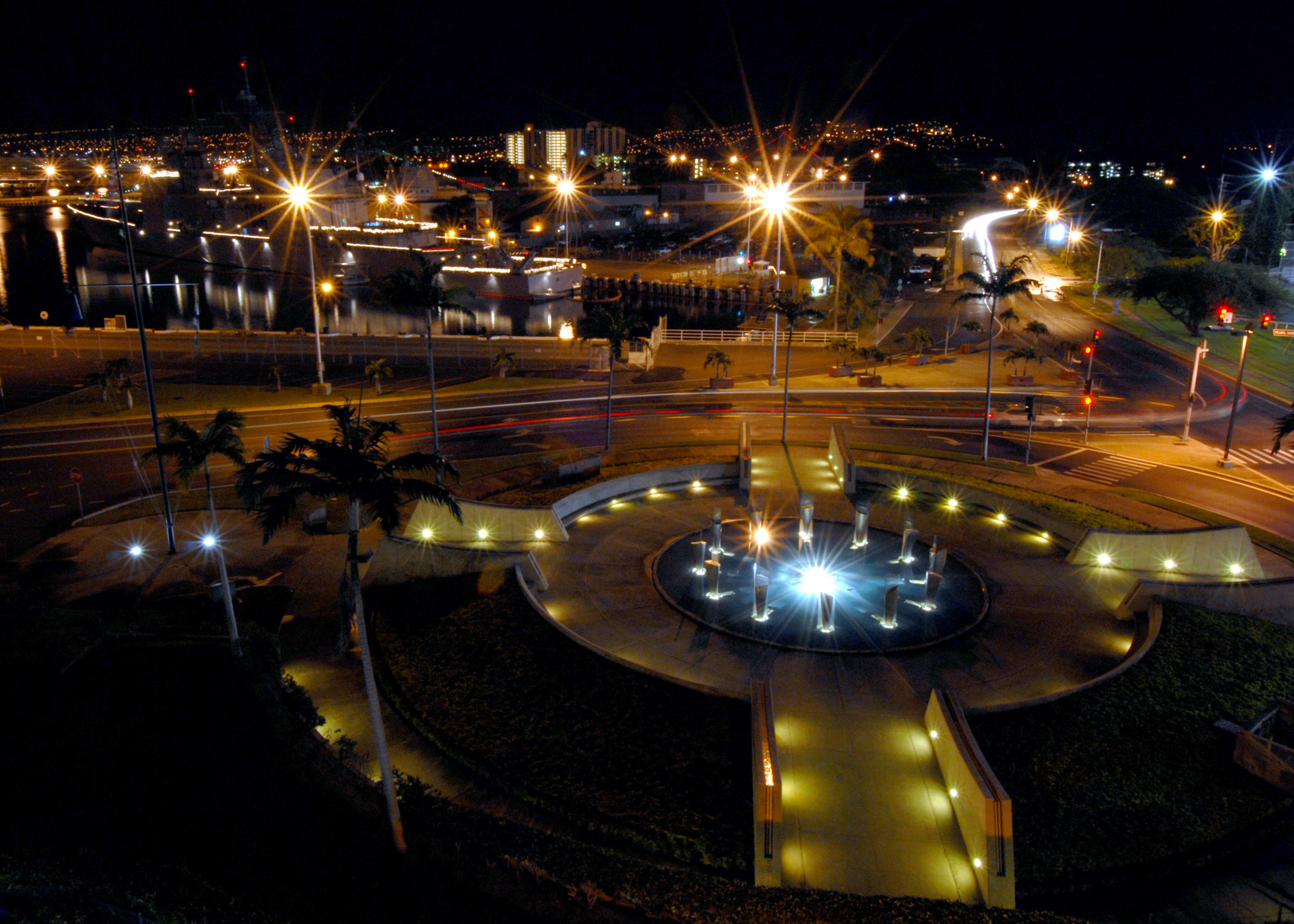
7 blades giving 14 spikes

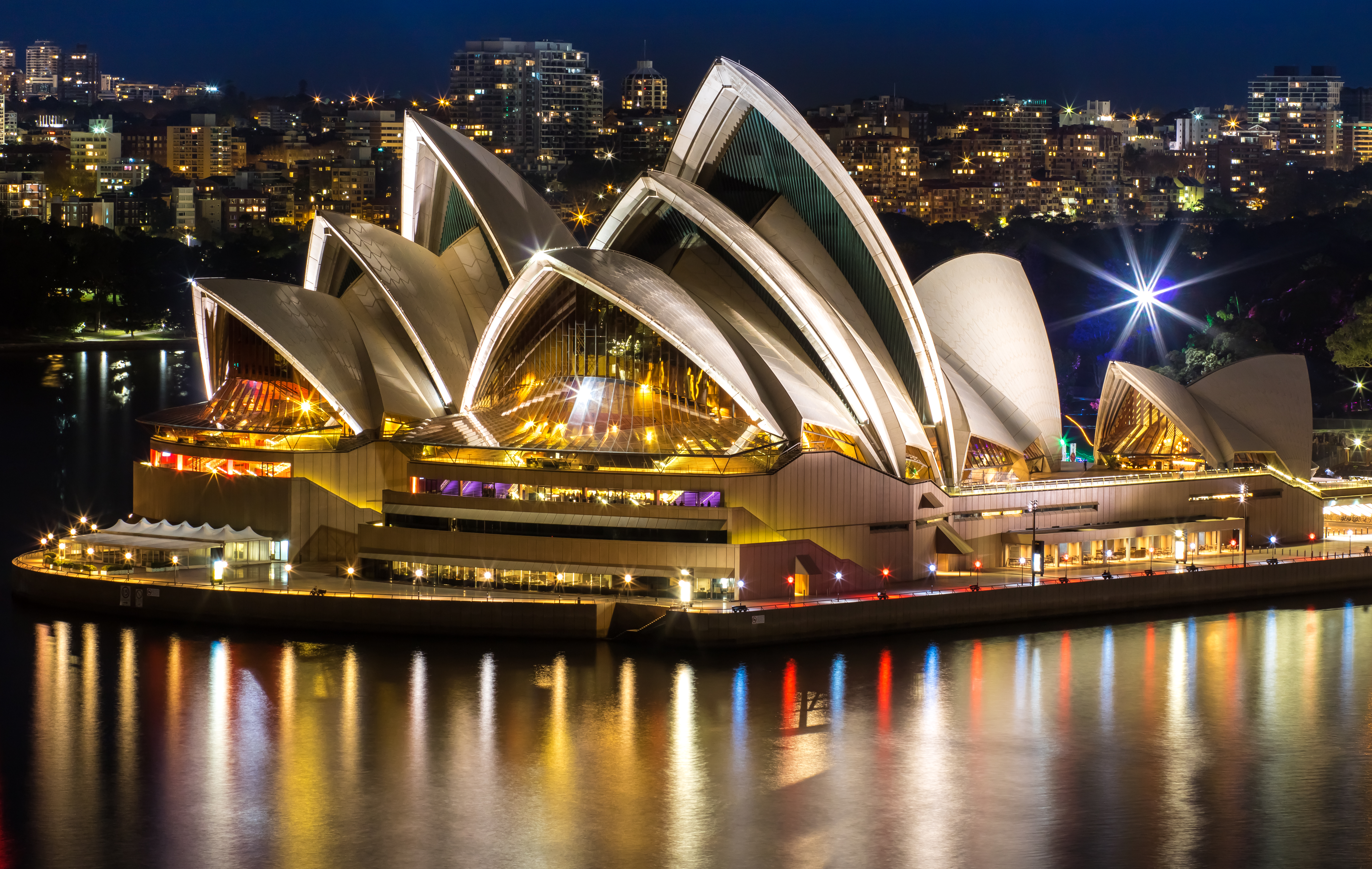
8 blades giving 8 spikes

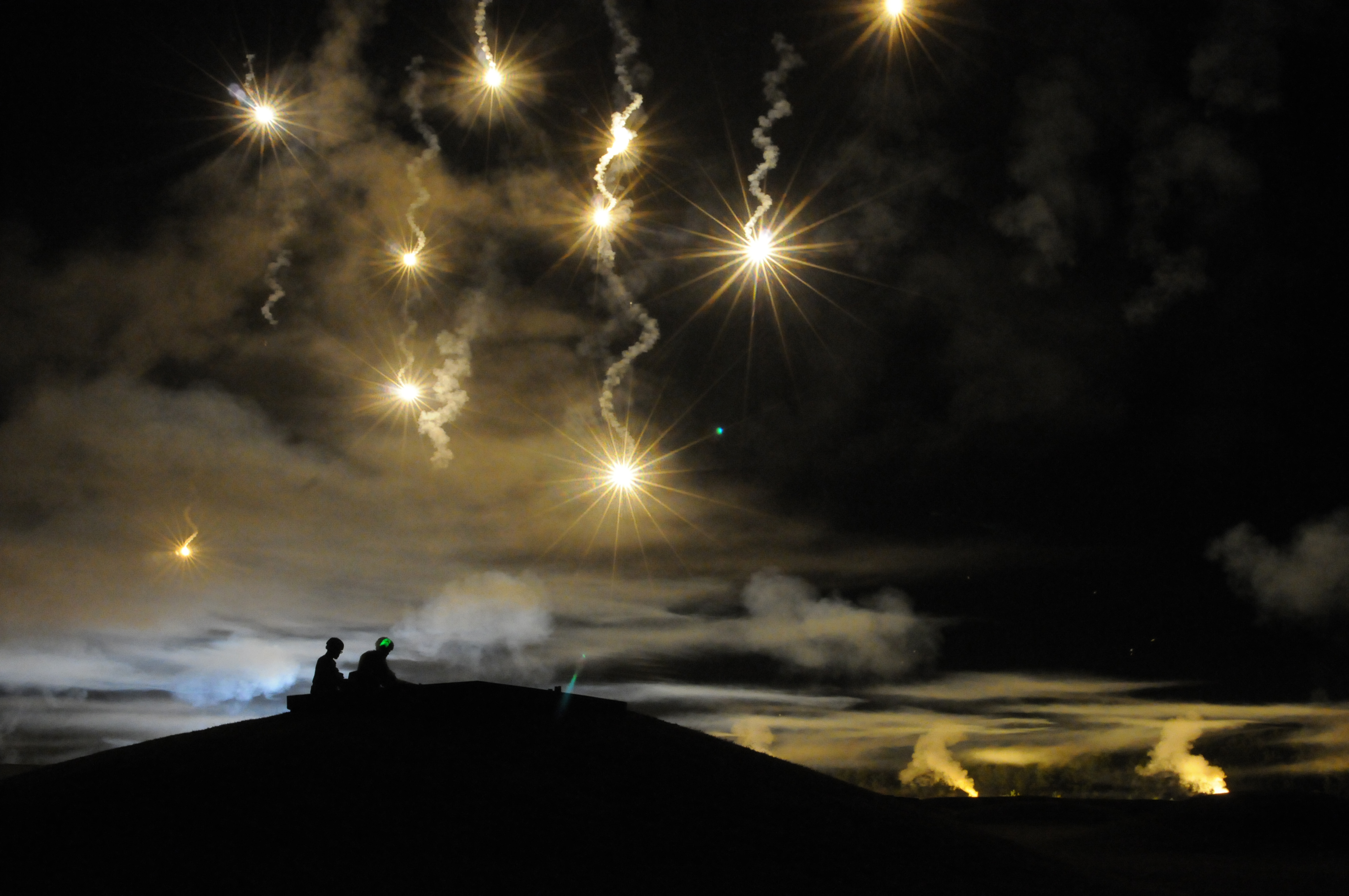
9 blades giving 18 spikes

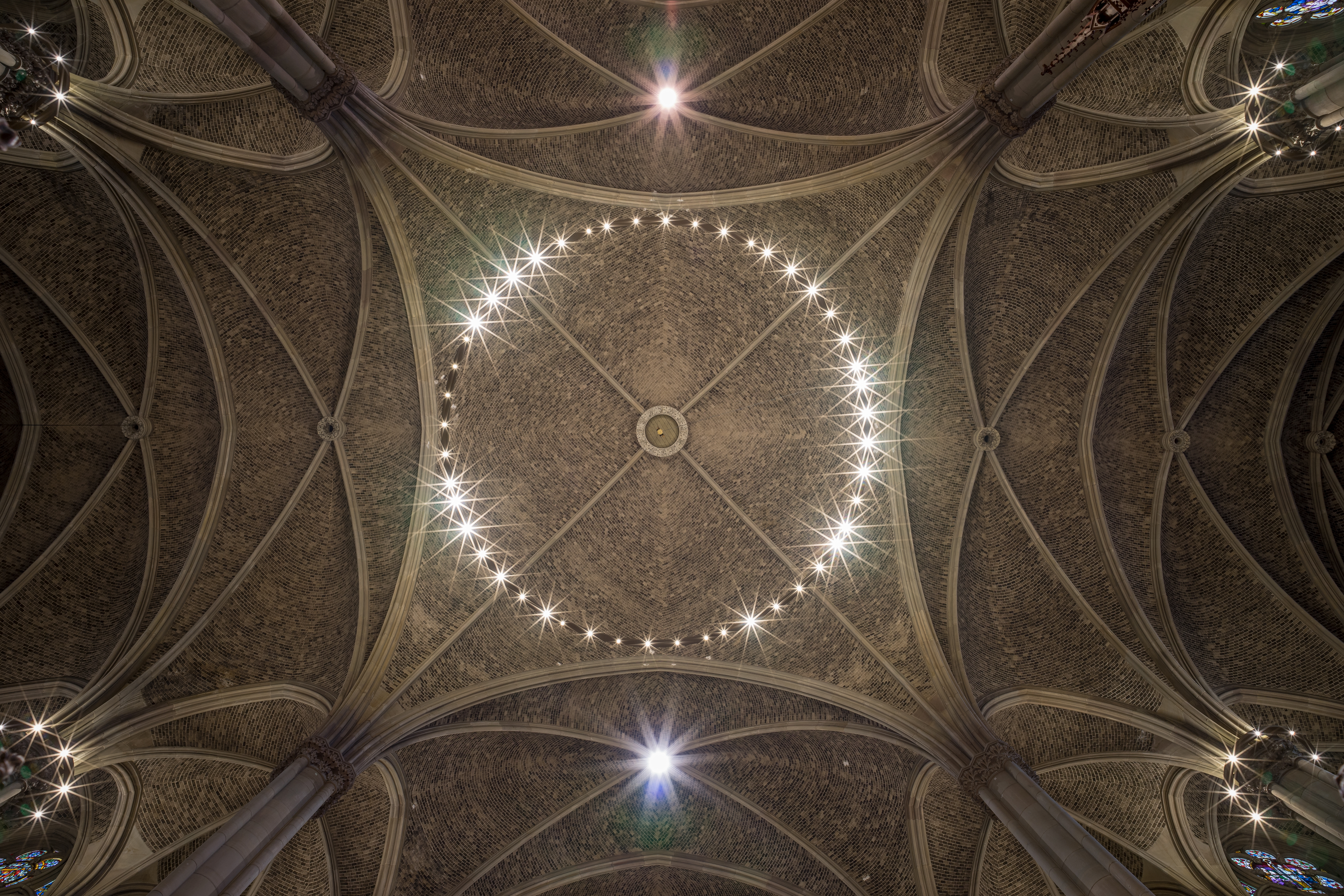
10 blades giving 10 spikes

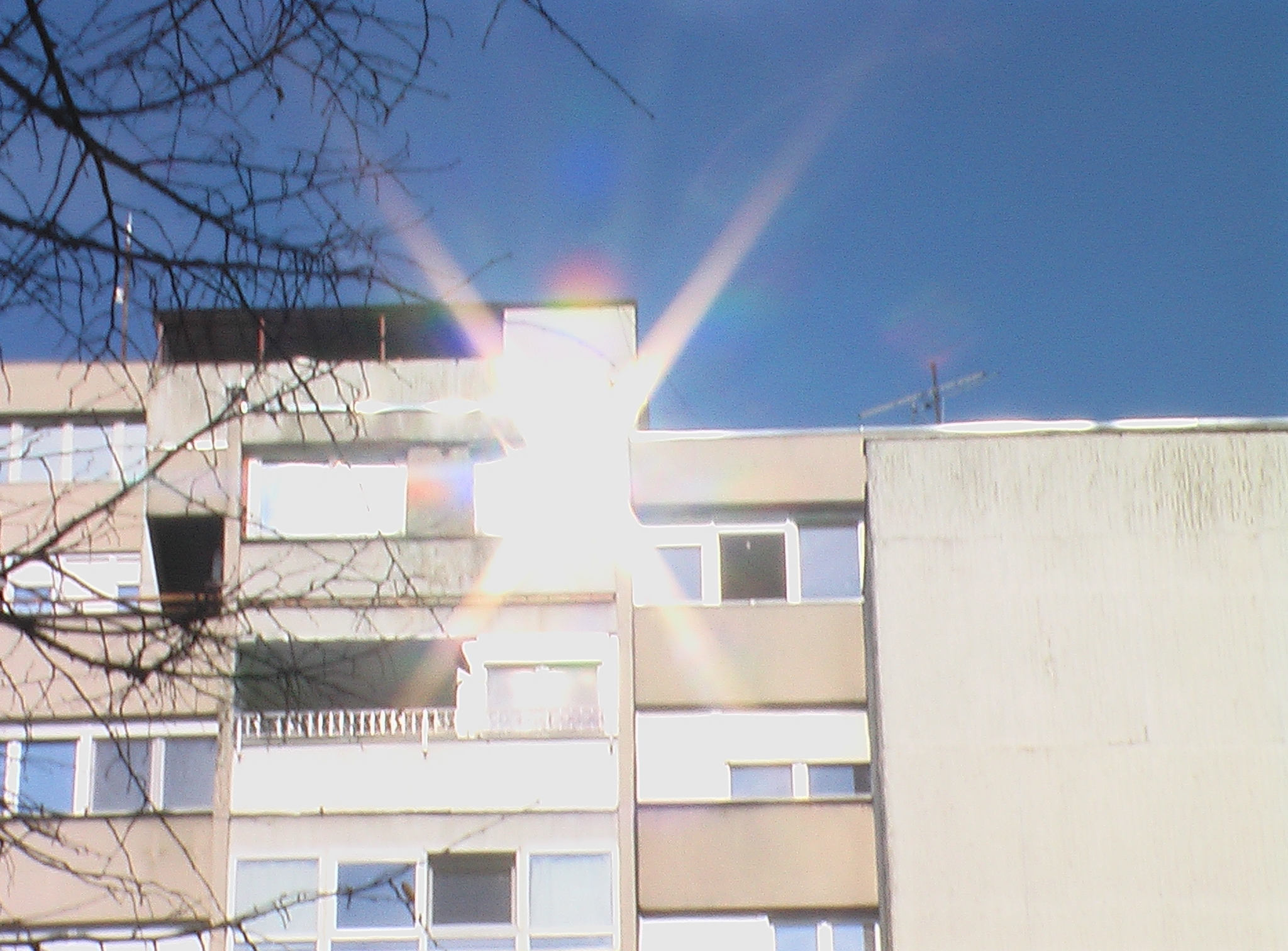
4 blades giving 4 spikes

=== Dirty optics ===
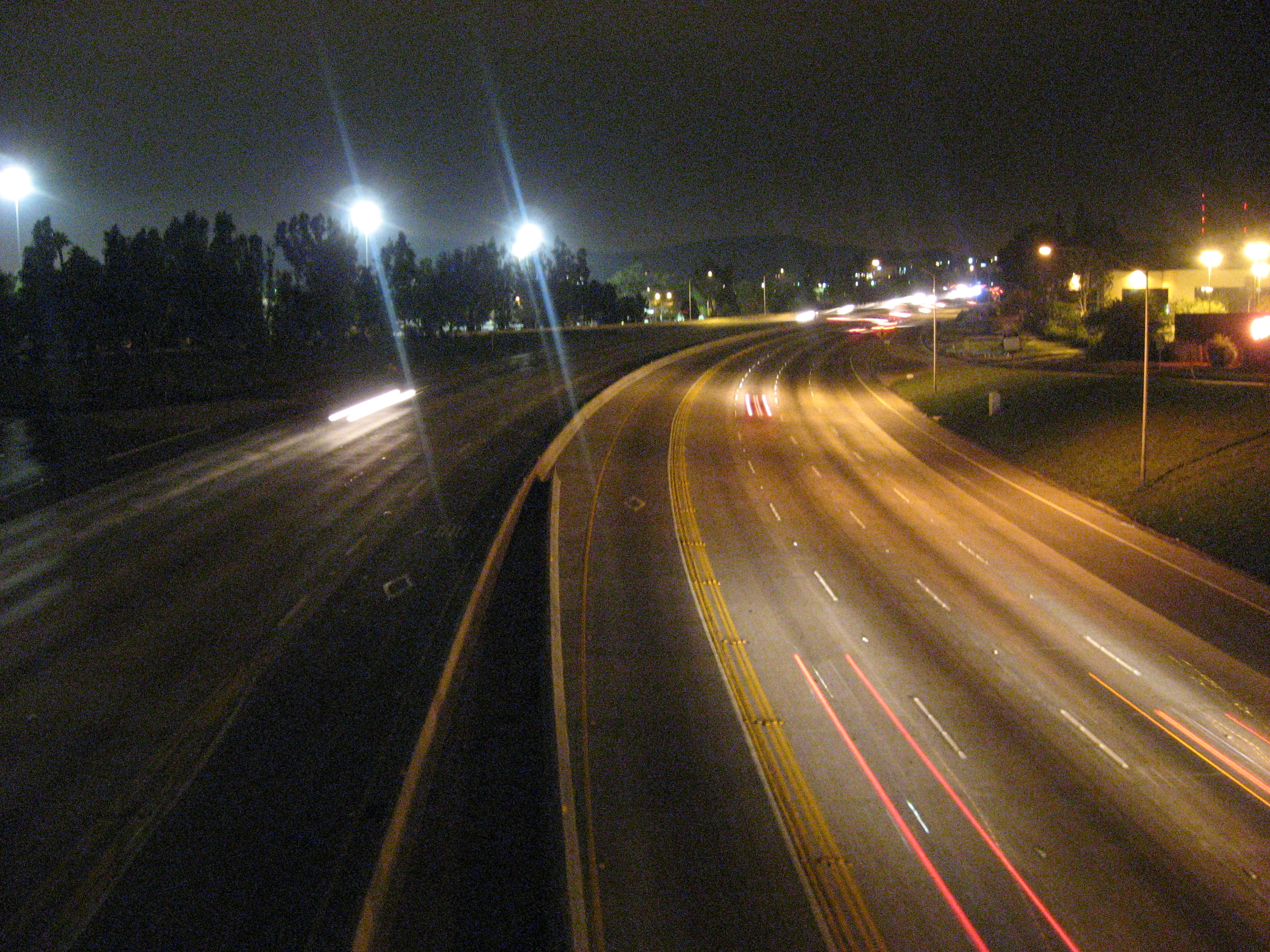
Streaks due to a dirty lens

An improperly cleaned lens or cover glass, or one with a fingerprint may have parallel lines which diffract light similarly to support vanes.

They can be distinguished from spikes due to non-circular aperture as they form a prominent smear in a single direction, and from CCD bloom by their oblique angle.

=== Obstructions ===
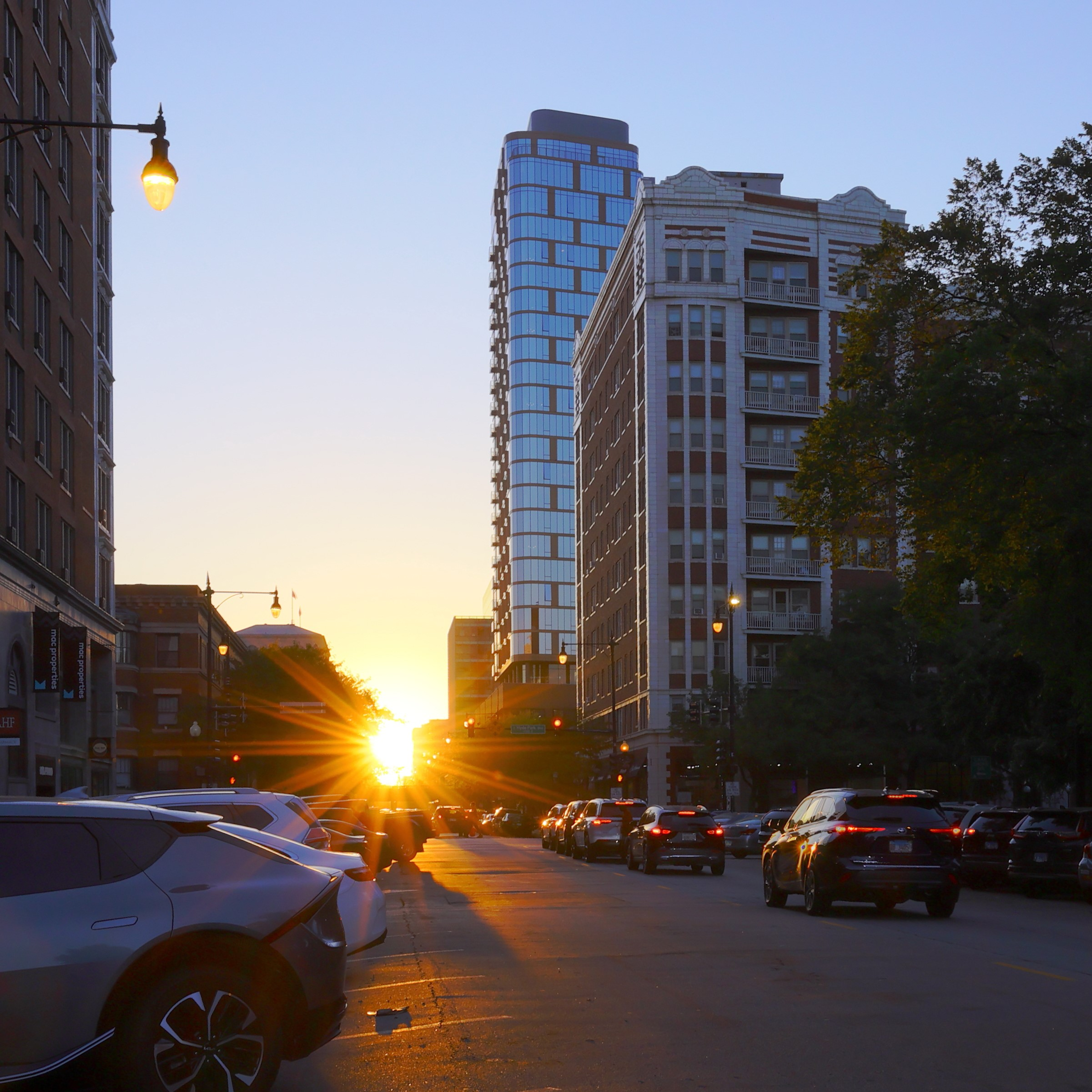
Near the equinoxes in Chicago sunrise and sunset photography of east–west urban street canyons often features diffraction spikes. Similar Manhattanhenge happenings occur throughout the year around the world.

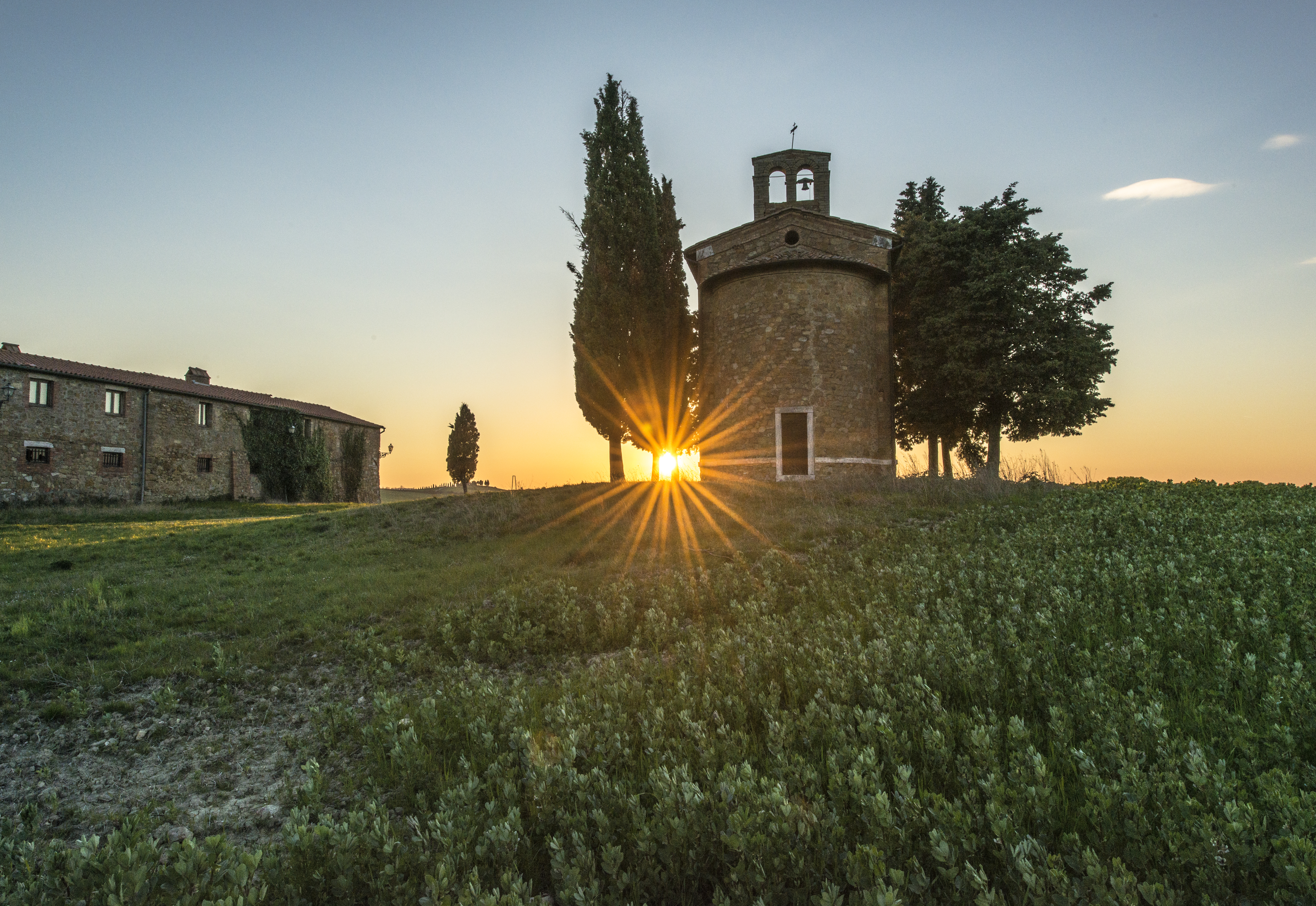
Sun obscured by tree

== In vision ==
In normal vision, diffraction through eyelashes – and due to the edges of the eyelids if one is squinting – produce many diffraction spikes. If it is windy, then the motion of the eyelashes cause spikes that move around and scintillate. After a blink, the eyelashes may come back in a different position and cause the diffraction spikes to jump around. This is classified as an entoptic phenomenon.

Diffraction spike in normal human vision can also be caused by some fibers in the eye lens sometimes called suture lines.

== Other uses ==
=== Bahtinov mask ===
Use of diffraction spikes to focus a telescope with a Bahtinov mask

In amateur astrophotography, a Bahtinov mask can be used to focus small astronomical telescopes accurately. Light from a bright point such as an isolated bright star reaching different quadrants of the primary mirror or lens is first passed through grilles at three different orientations. Half of the mask generates a narrow "X" shape from four diffraction spikes (blue and green in the illustration); the other half generates a straight line from two spikes (red). Changing the focus causes the shapes to move with respect to each other. When the line passes exactly through the middle of the "X", the telescope is in focus and the mask can be removed.

=== Star filter ===
A cross screen filter, also known as a star filter, creates a star pattern using a very fine diffraction grating embedded in the filter, or sometimes by the use of prisms in the filter. The number of stars varies by the construction of the filter, as does the number of points each star has.

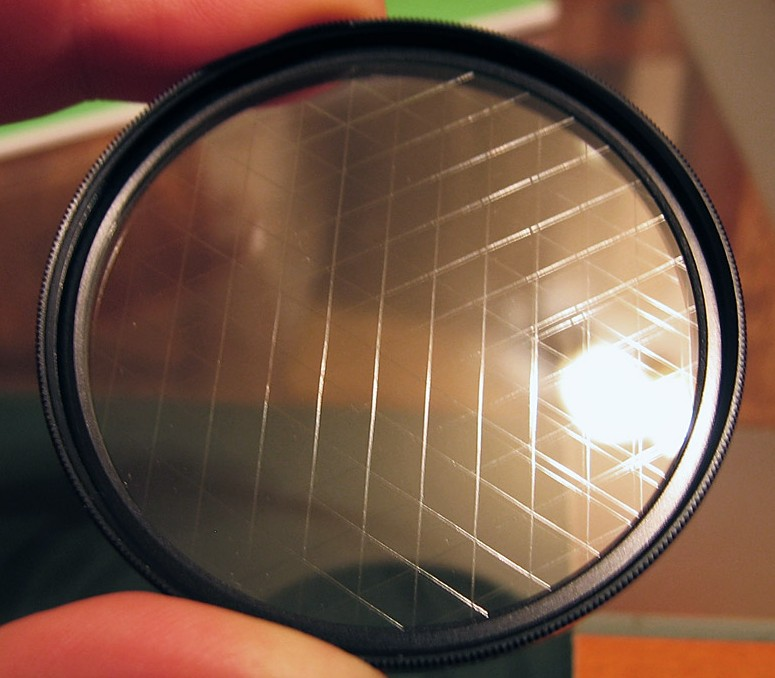
A cross-screen photo filter

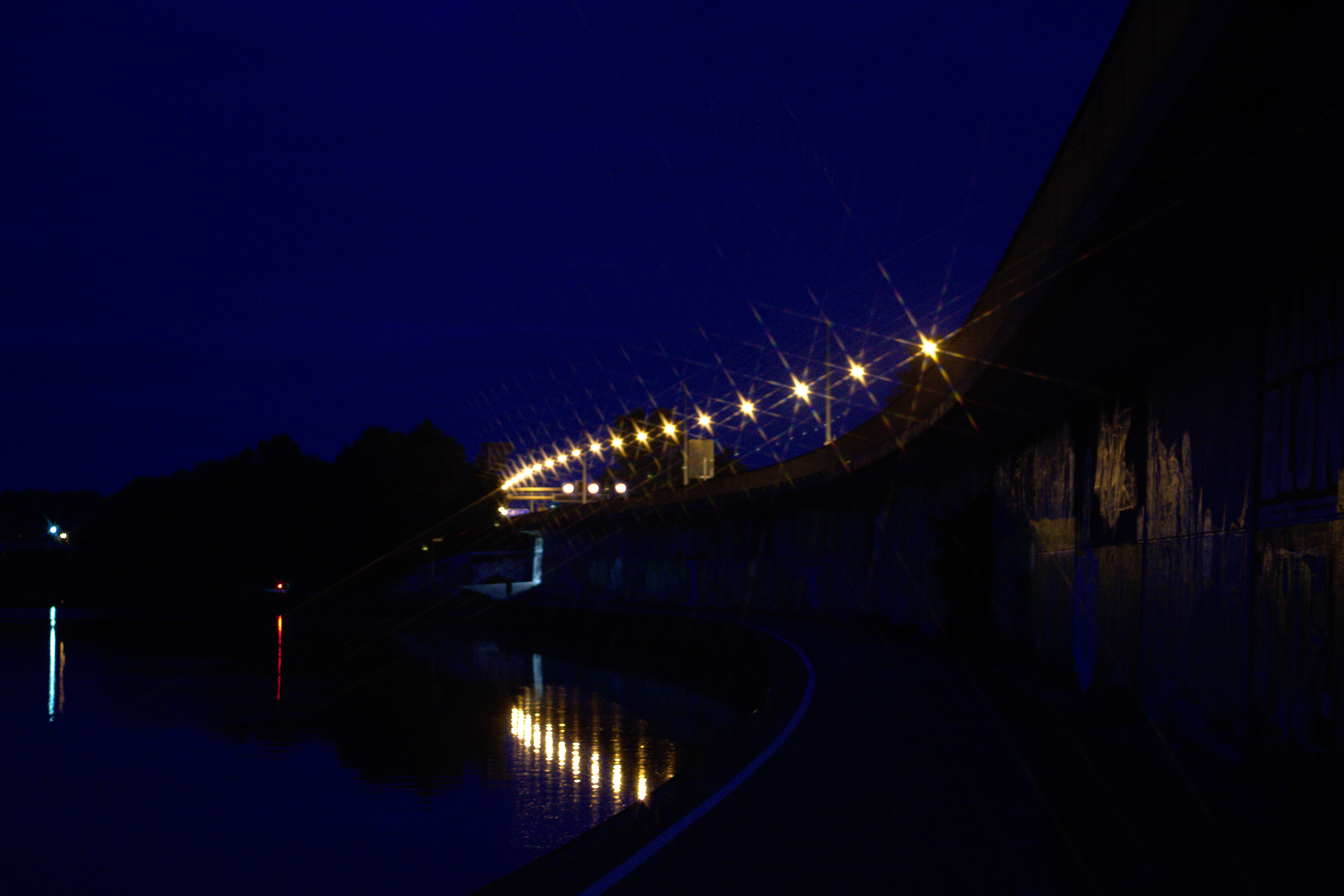
A picture taken with cross-screen filter

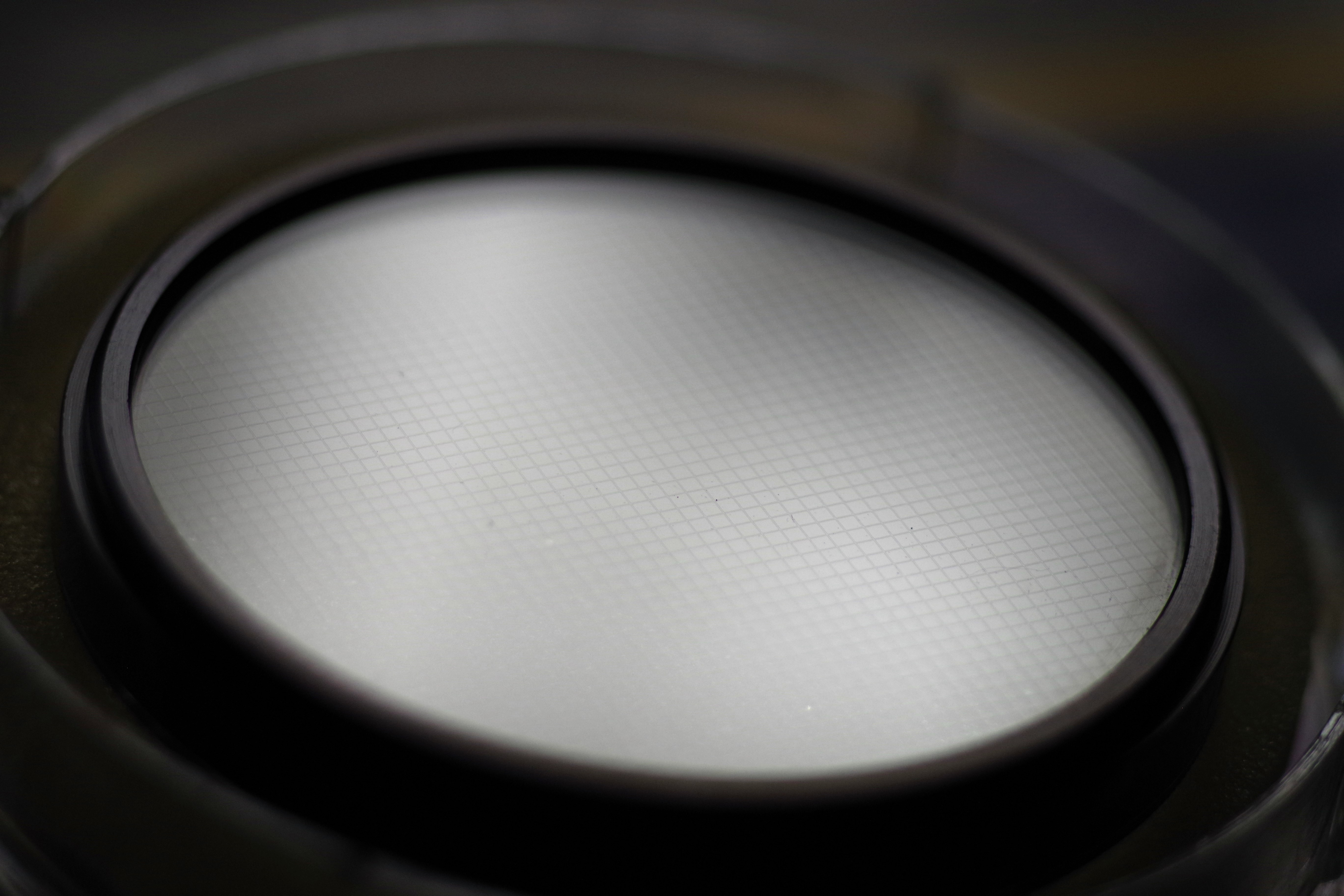
Another star filter

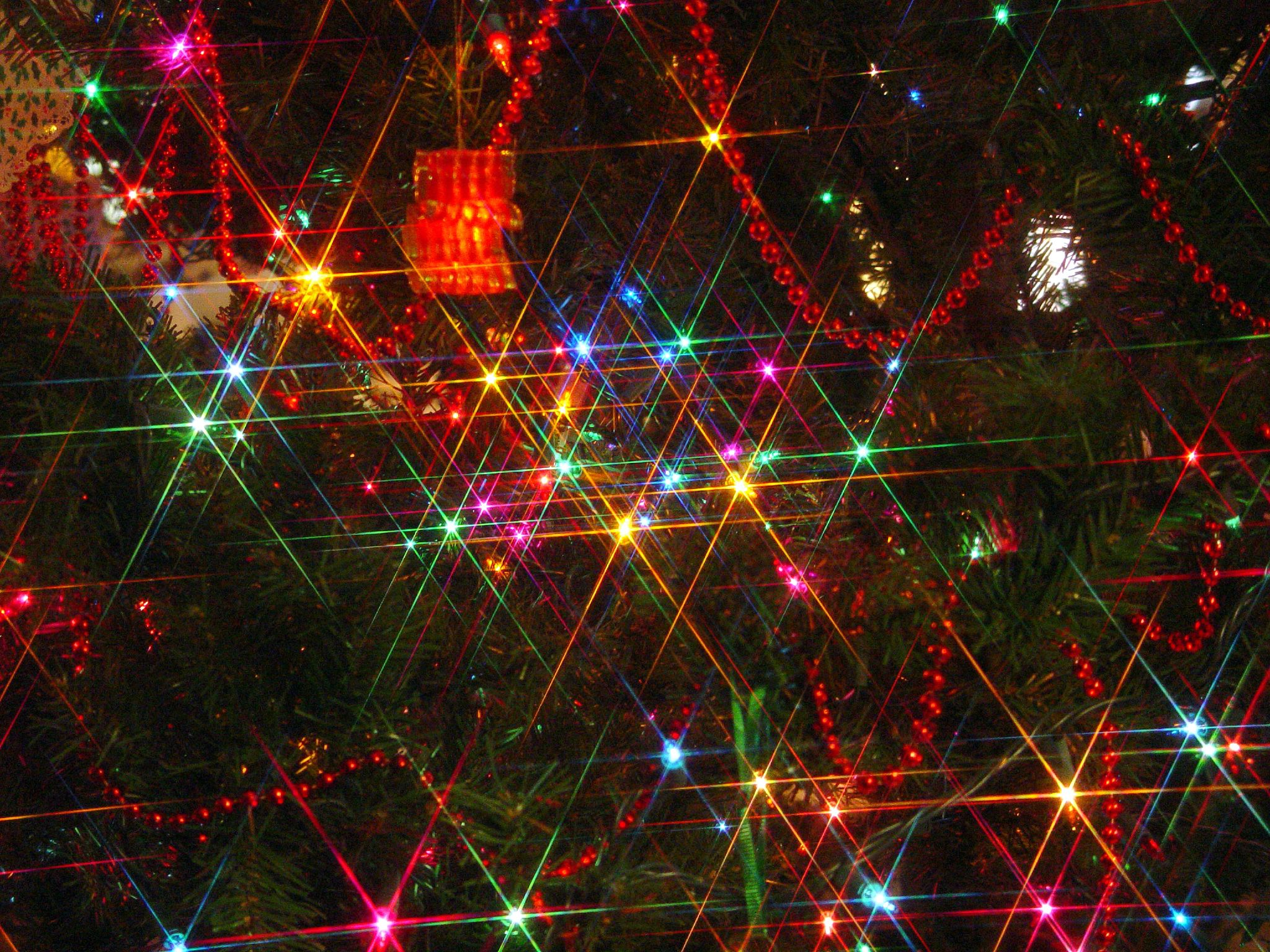
Effect of a triangular star filter

A similar effect is achieved by photographing bright lights through a window screen with vertical and horizontal wires. The angles of the bars of the cross depend on the orientation of the screen relative to the camera.
