= Bahtinov mask =

Telescope focusing device

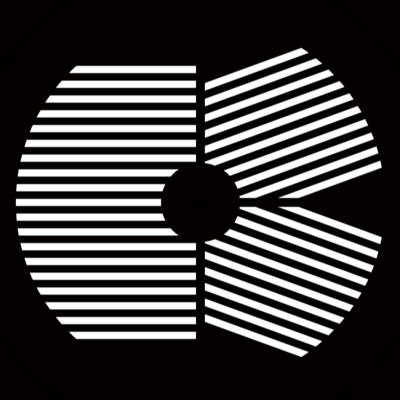
Example of Bahtinov mask

Operation of a Bahtinov mask for refracting optics, showing that rotating it 180° reverses the direction of the pattern

The Bahtinov mask is a device used to focus small astronomical telescopes accurately. Although masks have long been used as focusing aids, the distinctive pattern was invented by Russian amateur astrophotographer Pavel Bahtinov (Russian: Павел Бахтинов) in 2005. Precise focusing of telescopes and astrographs is critical to performing astrophotography.

The telescope is pointed at a bright star, and a mask is placed in front of the telescope's objective (or in front of the aperture).

The mask consists of three separate grids, positioned in such a way that the grids produce three angled diffraction spikes at the focal plane of the instrument for each bright image element. As the instrument's focus is changed, the central spike appears to move from one side of the star to the other. In reality, all three spikes move, but the central spike moves in the opposite direction to the two spikes forming the "X". Optimal focus is achieved when the middle spike is centered between the other two spikes.

Small deviations from optimal focus are easily visible. For astrophotography, a digital image can be analyzed by software to locate the alignment of the spikes to sub-pixel resolution.

The direction of this displacement indicates the direction of the necessary focus correction. Rotating the mask through 180° will reverse the direction of spike movement, so it is easier to use if placed on the telescope with consistent orientation. The mask must be removed after accurate focus is achieved.

The mask works by replacing the aperture stop of the optical system (normally the circular shape of the objective itself) with a stop which is asymmetric and periodic. Viewing a point source (such as a star) yields a diffraction pattern at the focal plane representing the Fraunhofer diffraction transform of the aperture shape. This pattern normally would be an Airy disk resulting from a circular aperture, but with the mask in place, the pattern exhibits asymmetric spikes representing the transform of the mask pattern's spatial frequency and orientation. A very bright star and very dark sky are required to produce highly contrasted spikes that are clearly visible. The diffraction effect is similar to producing sunstar patterns in landscape photography with ordinary camera lenses, where the mechanical iris of the lens is adjusted to a small polygonal shape with sharp corners.

In the example below, the central pattern shows good focus. The central spike is noticeably displaced from the central position in the left and right images.

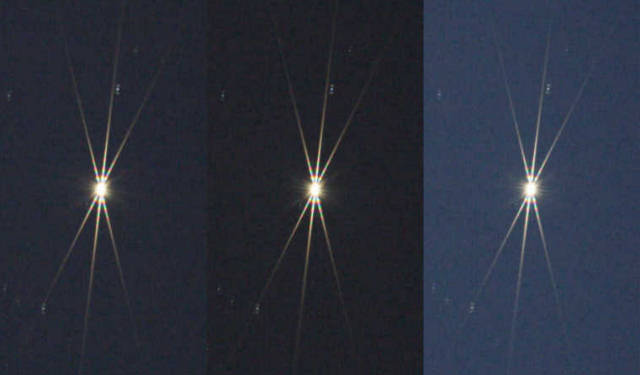
Example diffraction patterns produced by a Bahtinov mask
(middle: in focus, left and right: slightly out of focus)

Simulation of the Bahtinov mask diffraction pattern, using "Maskulator". Each frame shows a focus difference of 140.6 μm.

== See also ==
- Carey mask
- Hartmann mask
- Ronchi ruling
