= Hartmann mask =

Telescope focusing device

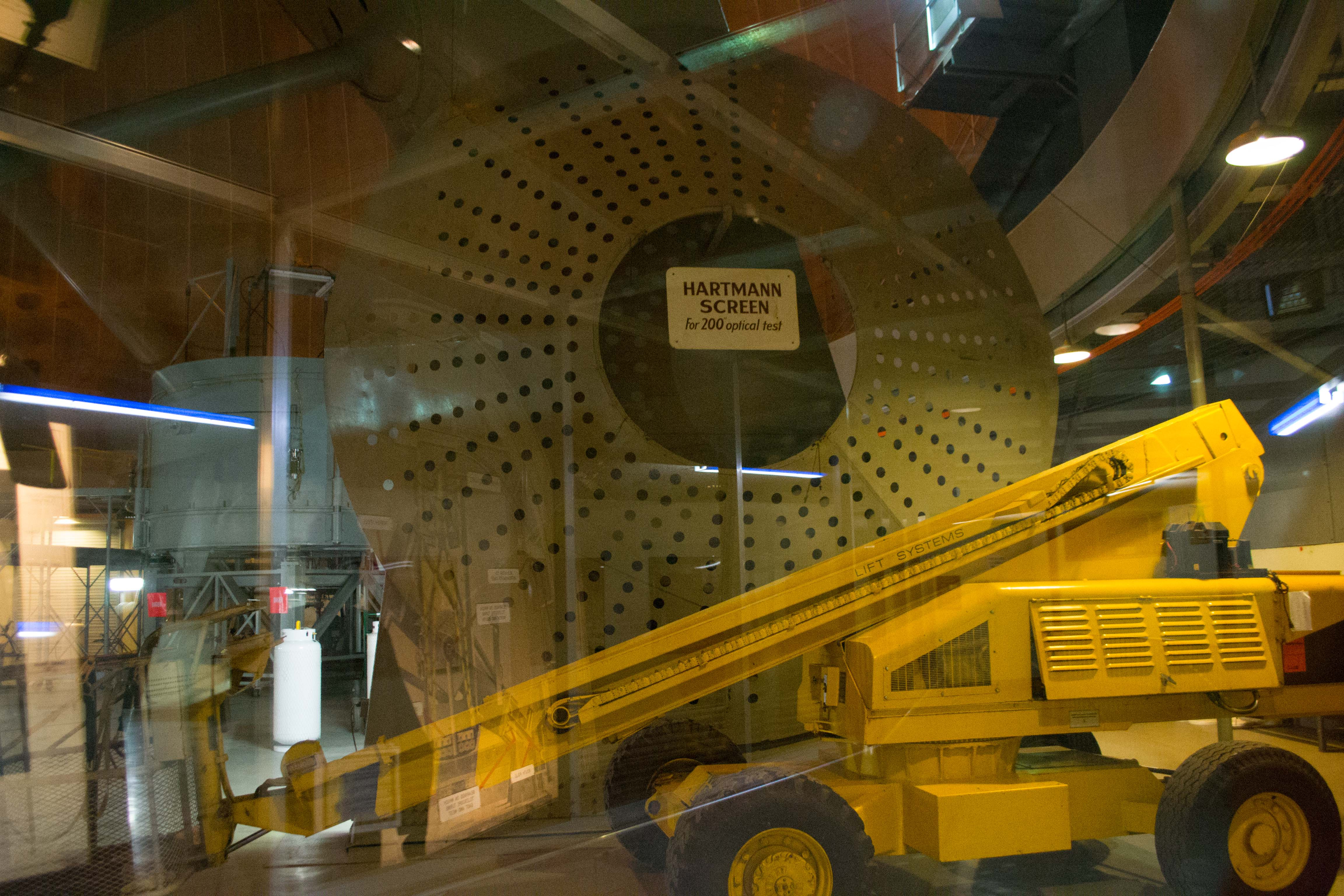
Hartmann screen used for the 200-inch (5.1 m) Hale Telescope

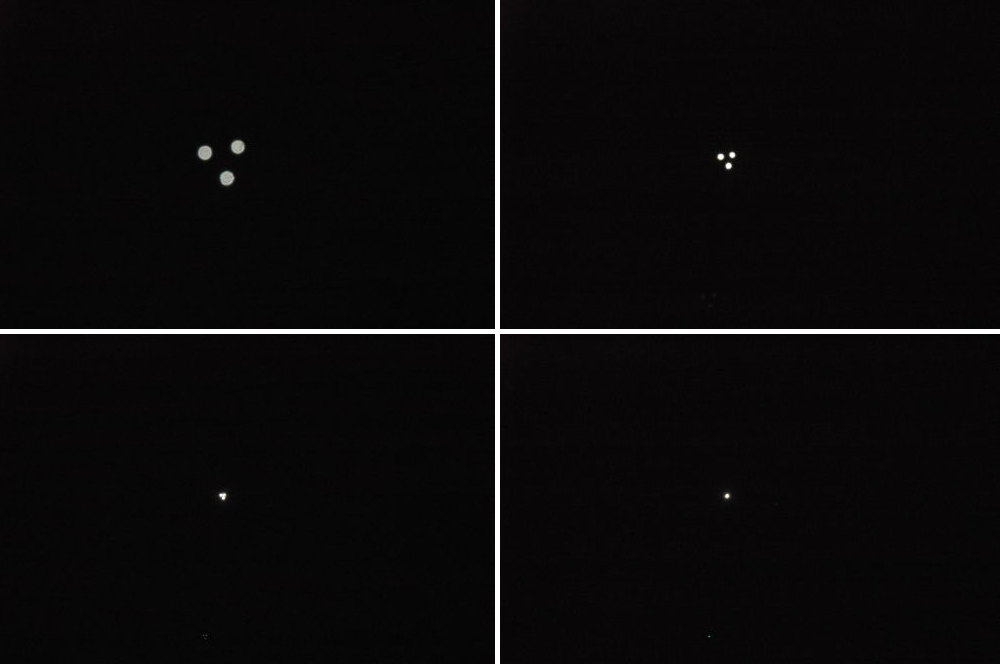
Using a Hartmann mask to adjust focus

Hartmann mask is a tool to help focusing telescopes, mainly used by amateur astronomers. It is named after the German astronomer Johannes Franz Hartmann (1865–1936), who developed it around 1900.

== History ==
Hartmann mask was invented as a tool to check the quality of large optical mirrors. It was especially useful for large non-spherical mirrors for telescopes. For example, the illustration on the right shows the Hartmann mask used to test the Hale Telescope five-meter primary mirror. In today's professional telescope making, it has been completely superseded by interferometric methods.

== Theory and practice ==
Every part of a mirror or lens produces the same image as the whole optical element. The light is focused at the focal point. The light rays, however, go through different points of a plane before or behind the focus.

This phenomenon can be used when focusing a telescope. The Hartmann mask is a simple opaque mask containing two or three holes. (This device is called a Hartmann mask if it has multiple holes, or a Scheiner disk if it has two holes.) The mask covers the aperture of the telescope.

When the apparatus is out of focus, multiple images can be seen if the telescope is pointed towards a bright light source (Moon, bright star). Adjusting the focuser, the images can be made to overlap, forming a single bright, clear picture. The mask may also be used to check the figure of a mirror, as all the holes in the mask should produce the same image.

== See also ==
- Bahtinov mask
- Carey mask
- Shack–Hartmann wavefront sensor
