= Carey mask =

Telescope focusing device

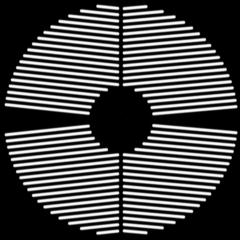
Carey mask

A Carey mask (named after the inventor, George F. Carey) is a focusing aid for astronomical telescopes. The mask is in the form of a thin card or sheet that is placed over the front aperture of the telescope. There are four series of slits in the mask which form a diffraction pattern in the image plane.

In this example the two sets of slits on the left are angled at 12 degrees to each other. Those on the right are angled at 10 degrees to each other. Different telescope and imaging combinations may require slightly different angles.

The diffraction pattern caused by the left hand slits will be in the form of an 'X'. The right hand slits will also form an 'X' shape, but the lines forming the 'X' will cross at a narrower angle. When perfect focus is achieved the two 'X's will be superimposed and be perfectly symmetrical. Any slight error in focus will cause the 'X's to be offset, and this is very noticeable to the naked eye.

In the example images below, focus error is obvious in the first two images. The third image is very close to perfect focus as shown by the equal spacing between the elongated spikes on the left and the right.

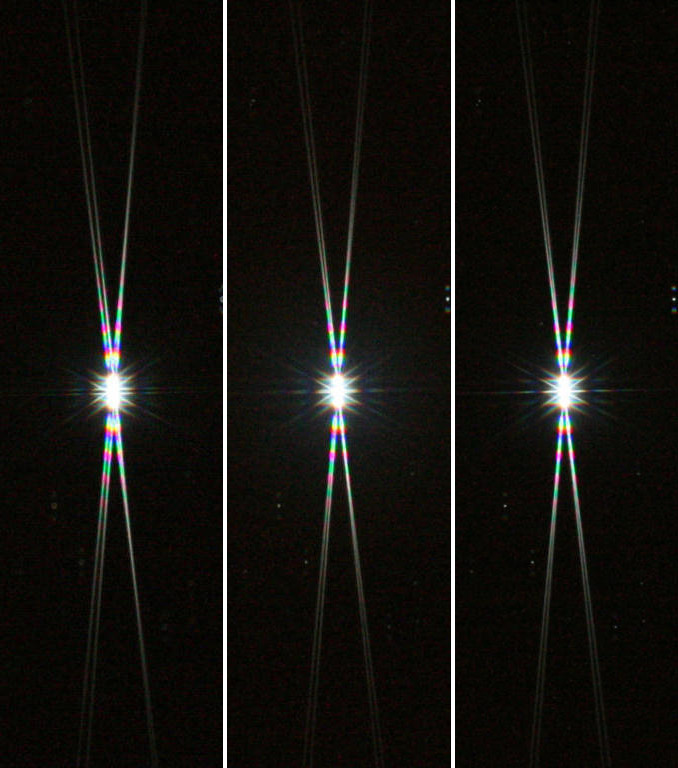

A negative image can sometimes show the diffraction spikes more clearly.

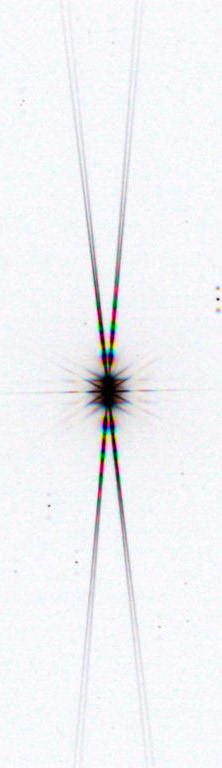

The enlarged view below shows the left hand spikes to be slightly further apart than those on the right. This is an indication that the focus knob needs to be rotated slightly anti-clockwise. If the right hand spikes were further apart, a clockwise rotation would be needed. The mask should always be placed over the aperture with the same orientation. If the mask is rotated 180 degrees, then the focus knob directions would be reversed. The operator soon becomes familiar with the rotation directions needed for a given setup.

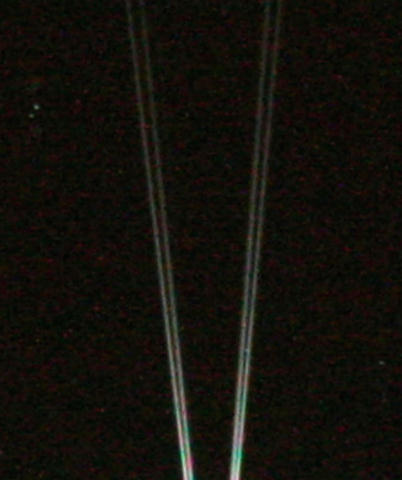

This indication of the direction of focus change needed removes much of the trial and error that can often be encountered when attempting astrophotography.

== See also ==
- Bahtinov mask
- Hartmann mask
