= Telescope =

Instrument that makes distant objects appear magnified

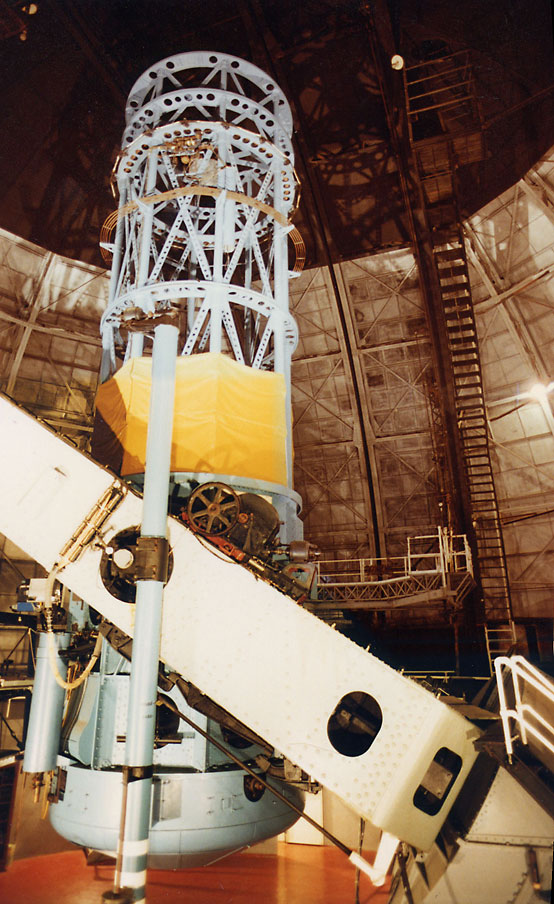
The 100-inch (2.5 m) Hooker reflecting telescope at Mount Wilson Observatory near Los Angeles, used by Edwin Hubble to measure galaxy redshifts and discover the general expansion of the universe.

A telescope is a device used to observe distant objects by their emission, absorption, or reflection of electromagnetic radiation. Originally, it was an optical instrument using lenses, curved mirrors, or a combination of both to observe distant objects – an optical telescope. Nowadays, the word "telescope" is defined as a wide range of instruments capable of detecting different regions of the electromagnetic spectrum, and in some cases other types of detectors.

The first known practical telescopes were refracting telescopes with glass lenses and were invented in the Netherlands at the beginning of the 17th century. They were used for both terrestrial applications and astronomy.

The reflecting telescope, which uses mirrors to collect and focus light, was invented within a few decades of the first refracting telescope.

In the 20th century, many new types of telescopes were invented, including radio telescopes in the 1930s and infrared telescopes in the 1960s.

== Etymology ==
The word telescope was coined in 1611 by the Greek mathematician Giovanni Demisiani for one of Galileo Galilei's instruments presented at a banquet at the Accademia dei Lincei. In the Starry Messenger, Galileo had used the Latin term perspicillum. The root of the word is from the Ancient Greek τῆλε, tele 'far' and σκοπεῖν, skopein 'to look or see'; τηλεσκόπος, teleskopos 'far-seeing'.

== History ==
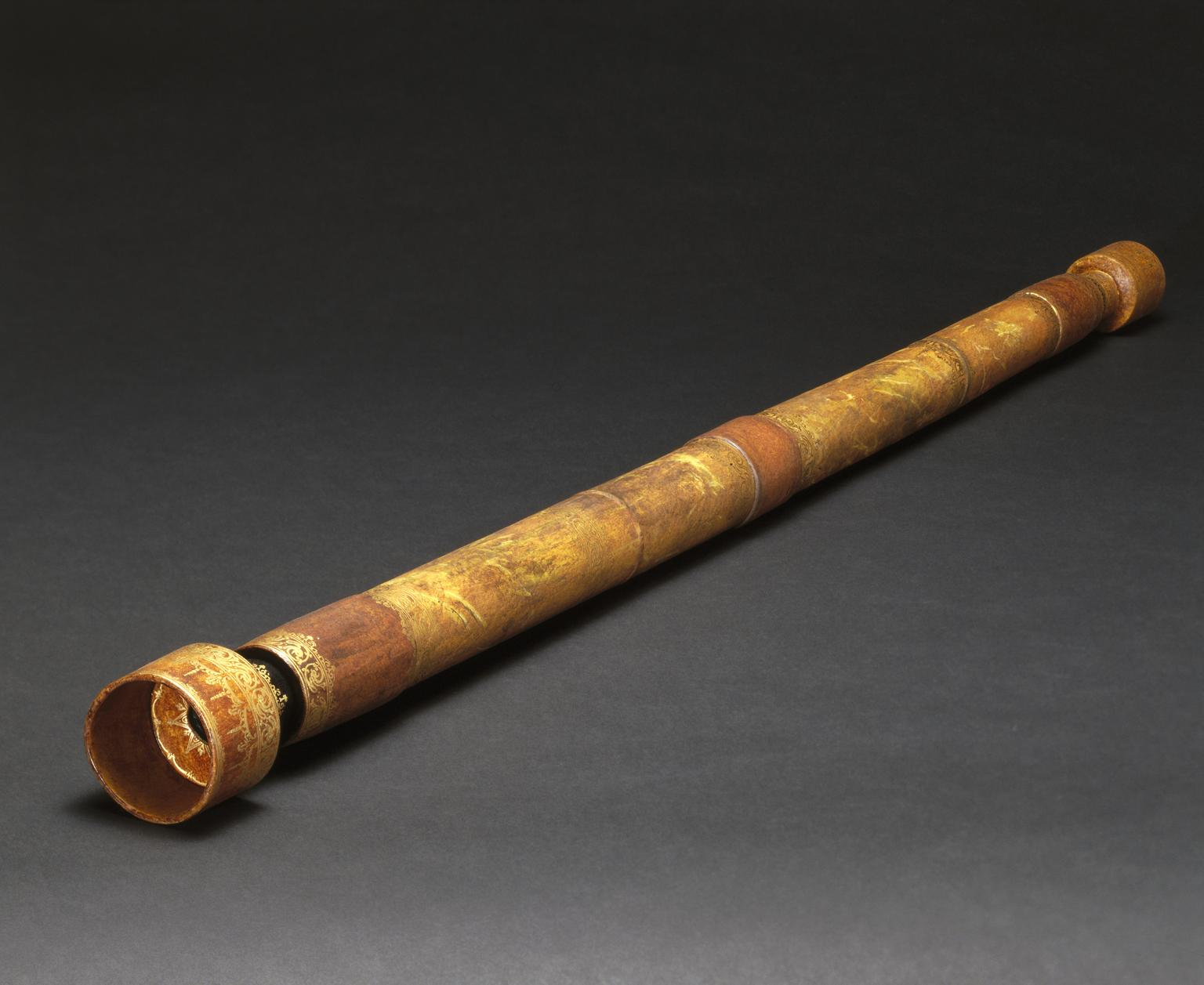
Replica of possibly the oldest surviving telescope (1609–1640), suspected to be an early "Cannocchiali" refracting telescope by Galileo Galilei.

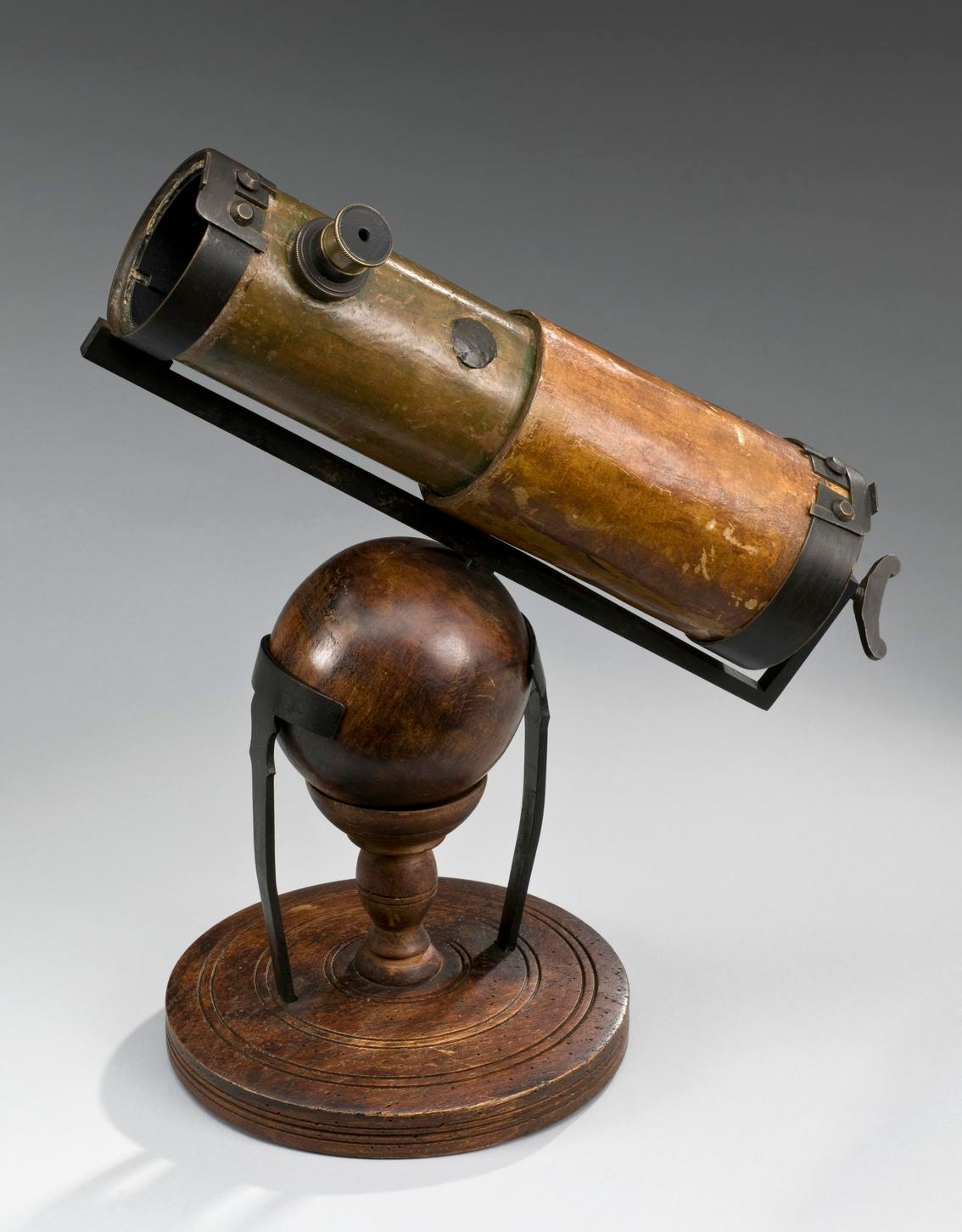
A replica of a second reflecting telescope Isaac Newton presented to the Royal Society in London in 1672

The earliest existing record of a telescope was a 1608 patent submitted to the government in the Netherlands by Middelburg spectacle maker Hans Lipperhey for a refracting telescope. The actual inventor is unknown but word of it spread through Europe. Galileo heard about it and, in 1609, built his own version, and made his telescopic observations of celestial objects.

The idea that the objective, or light-gathering element, could be a mirror instead of a lens was being investigated soon after the invention of the refracting telescope. The potential advantages of using parabolic mirrors—reduction of spherical aberration and no chromatic aberration—led to many proposed designs and several attempts to build reflecting telescopes. In 1668, Isaac Newton built the first practical reflecting telescope, of a design which now bears his name, the Newtonian reflector. John Dobson invented the Dobsonian telescope in 1956.

The invention of the achromatic lens in 1733 partially corrected color aberrations present in the simple lens and enabled the construction of shorter, more functional refracting telescopes. Reflecting telescopes, though not limited by the color problems seen in refractors, were hampered by the use of fast tarnishing speculum metal mirrors employed during the 18th and early 19th century—a problem alleviated by the introduction of silver coated glass mirrors in 1857, and aluminized mirrors in 1932. The maximum physical size limit for refracting telescopes is about 1 meter (39 inches), dictating that the vast majority of large optical research telescopes built since the turn of the 20th century have been reflectors. The largest reflecting telescopes currently have objectives larger than 10 meters (33 feet), and work is underway on several 30–40m designs.

The 20th century also saw the development of telescopes that worked in a wide range of wavelengths from radio to gamma-rays. The first purpose-built radio telescope went into operation in 1937. Since then, a large variety of complex astronomical instruments have been developed.

== In space ==
Since the atmosphere is opaque for most of the electromagnetic spectrum, only a few bands can be observed from the Earth's surface. These bands are visible – near-infrared and a portion of the radio-wave part of the spectrum. For this reason there are no X-ray or far-infrared ground-based telescopes as these have to be observed from orbit. Even if a wavelength is observable from the ground, it might still be advantageous to place a telescope on a satellite due to issues such as clouds, astronomical seeing and light pollution.

The disadvantages of launching a space telescope include cost, size, maintainability and upgradability.

Some examples of space telescopes from NASA are the Hubble Space Telescope that detects visible light, ultraviolet, and near-infrared wavelengths, the Spitzer Space Telescope that detects infrared radiation, and the Kepler Space Telescope that discovered thousands of exoplanets. The latest telescope that was launched was the James Webb Space Telescope on 25 December 2021, in Kourou, French Guiana with an Ariane 5 rocket. The Webb telescope detects infrared light and orbits the L_{2} Lagrange Point of the earth-sun system.

== By electromagnetic spectrum ==
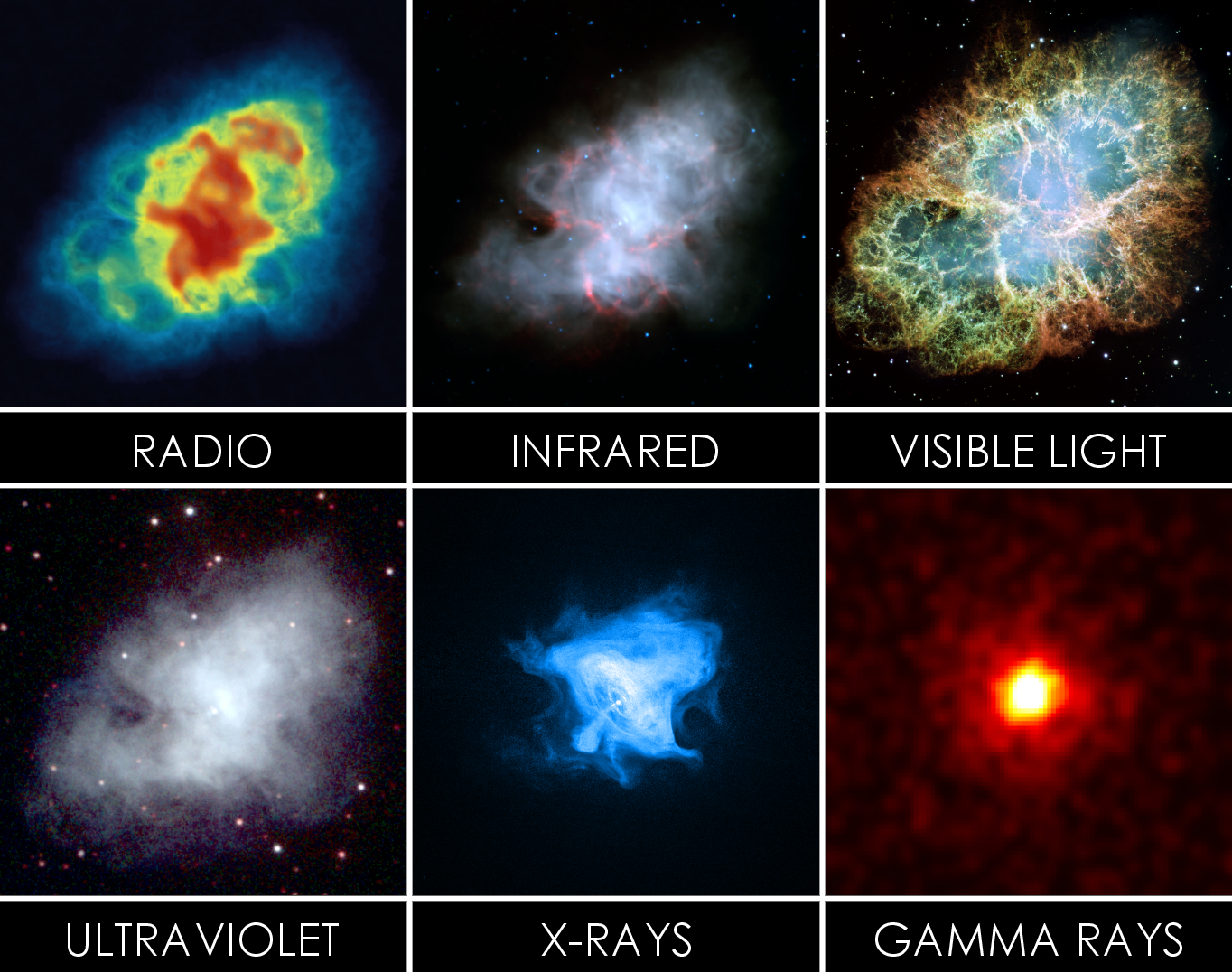
Six views of the Crab Nebula at different wavelengths of light

The name "telescope" covers a wide range of instruments. Most detect electromagnetic radiation, but there are major differences in how astronomers must go about collecting light (electromagnetic radiation) in different frequency bands.

As wavelengths become longer, it becomes easier to use antenna technology to interact with electromagnetic radiation (although it is possible to make very tiny antenna). The near-infrared can be collected much like visible light; however, in the far-infrared and submillimetre range, telescopes can operate more like a radio telescope. For example, the James Clerk Maxwell Telescope observes from wavelengths from 3 μm (0.003 mm) to 2000 μm (2 mm), but uses a parabolic aluminum antenna. On the other hand, the Spitzer Space Telescope, observing from about 3 μm (0.003 mm) to 180 μm (0.18 mm) uses a mirror (reflecting optics). Also using reflecting optics, the Hubble Space Telescope with Wide Field Camera 3 can observe in the frequency range from about 0.2 μm (0.0002 mm) to 1.7 μm (0.0017 mm) (from ultra-violet to infrared light).

With photons of the shorter wavelengths, with the higher frequencies, glancing-incident optics, rather than fully reflecting optics are used. Telescopes such as TRACE and SOHO use special mirrors to reflect extreme ultraviolet, producing higher resolution and brighter images than are otherwise possible. A larger aperture does not just mean that more light is collected, it also enables a finer angular resolution.

Telescopes may also be classified by location: ground telescope, space telescope, or flying telescope. They may also be classified by whether they are operated by professional astronomers or amateur astronomers. A vehicle or permanent campus containing one or more telescopes or other instruments is called an observatory.

=== Radio and submillimeter ===
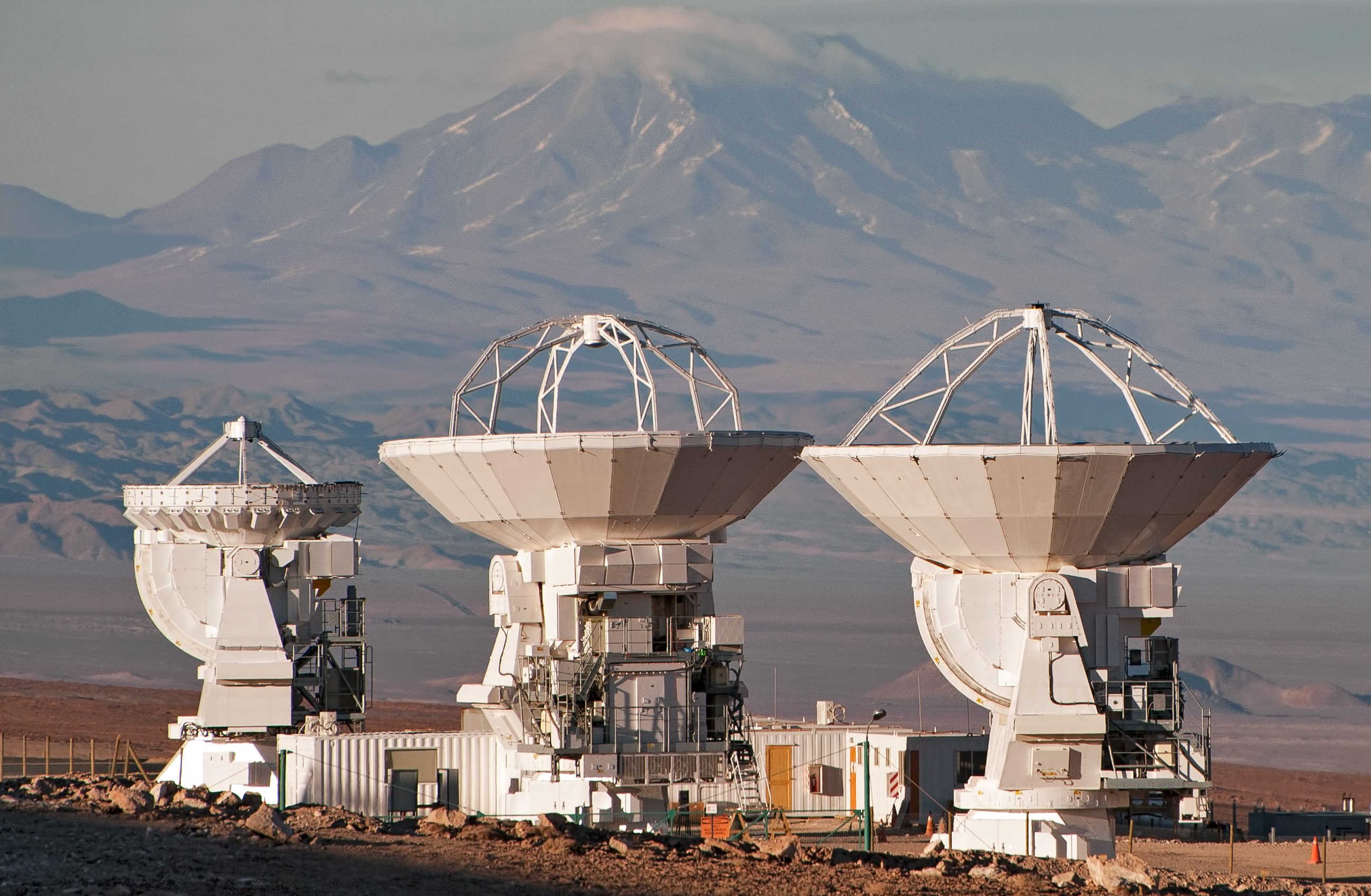
Three radio telescopes belonging to the Atacama Large Millimeter Array

Radio telescopes are directional radio antennas that typically employ a large dish to collect radio waves. The dishes are sometimes constructed of a conductive wire mesh whose openings are smaller than the wavelength being observed.

Unlike an optical telescope, which produces a magnified image of the patch of sky being observed, a traditional radio telescope dish contains a single receiver and records a single time-varying signal characteristic of the observed region; this signal may be sampled at various frequencies. In some newer radio telescope designs, a single dish contains an array of several receivers; this is known as a focal-plane array.

Map of the Square Kilometre Array, its membership and setup, which puts together radio telescopes in arrays for interferometric observation.

By collecting and correlating signals simultaneously received by several dishes, high-resolution images can be computed. Such multi-dish arrays are known as astronomical interferometers and the technique is called aperture synthesis. The 'virtual' apertures of these arrays are similar in size to the distance between the telescopes. As of 2005, the record array size is many times the diameter of the Earth – using space-based very-long-baseline interferometry (VLBI) telescopes such as the Japanese HALCA (Highly Advanced Laboratory for Communications and Astronomy) VSOP (VLBI Space Observatory Program) satellite.

Aperture synthesis is now also being applied to optical telescopes using optical interferometers (arrays of optical telescopes) and aperture masking interferometry at single reflecting telescopes.

Radio telescopes are also used to collect microwave radiation, which has the advantage of being able to pass through the atmosphere and interstellar gas and dust clouds.

Some radio telescopes such as the Allen Telescope Array are used by programs such as SETI and the Arecibo Observatory to search for extraterrestrial life.

=== Visible light ===
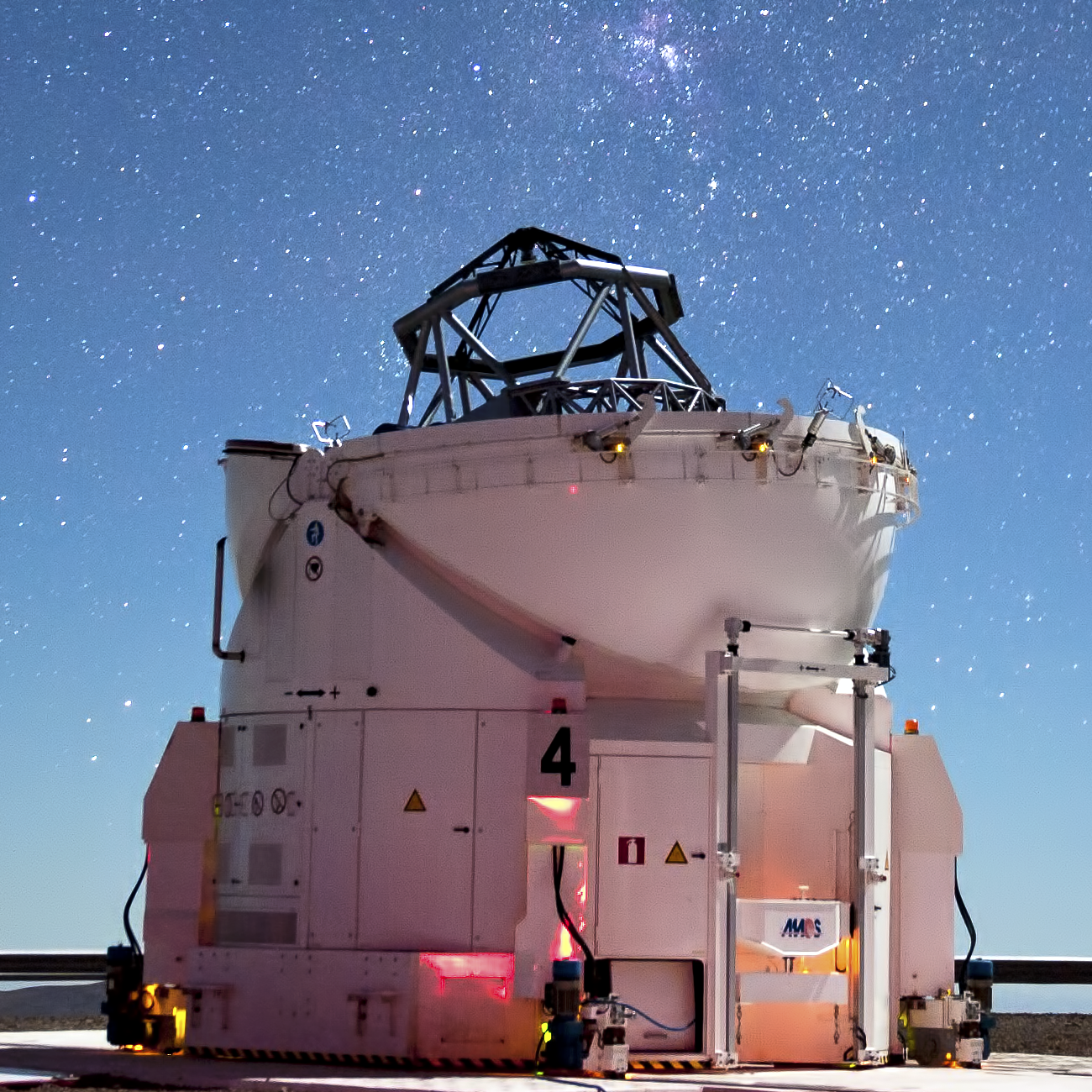
One of four auxiliary telescopes belong to the Very Large Telescope array

An optical telescope gathers and focuses light mainly from the visible part of the electromagnetic spectrum. Optical telescopes increase the apparent angular size of distant objects as well as their apparent brightness. For the image to be observed, photographed, studied, and sent to a computer, telescopes work by employing one or more curved optical elements, usually made from glass lenses and/or mirrors, to gather light and other electromagnetic radiation to bring that light or radiation to a focal point. Optical telescopes are used for astronomy and in many non-astronomical instruments, including: theodolites (including transits), spotting scopes, monoculars, binoculars, camera lenses, and spyglasses. There are three main optical types:

- The refracting telescope which uses lenses to form an image.
- The reflecting telescope which uses an arrangement of mirrors to form an image.
- The catadioptric telescope which uses mirrors combined with lenses to form an image.

A Fresnel imager is a proposed ultra-lightweight design for a space telescope that uses a Fresnel lens to focus light.

Beyond these basic optical types there are many sub-types of varying optical design classified by the task they perform such as astrographs, comet seekers and solar telescopes.

=== Ultraviolet ===
Most ultraviolet light is absorbed by the Earth's atmosphere, so observations at these wavelengths must be performed from the upper atmosphere or from space.

=== X-ray ===
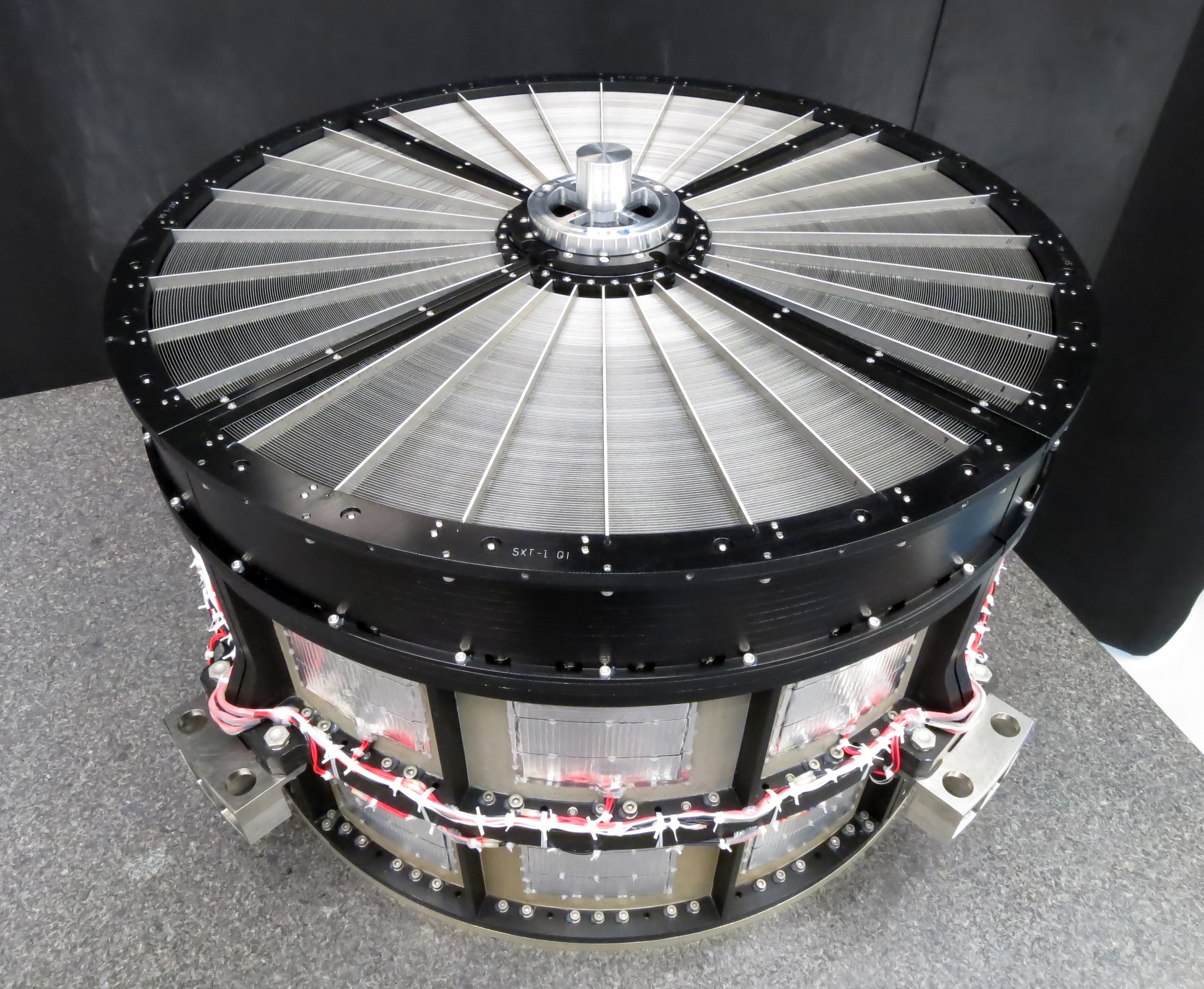
Hitomi telescope's X-ray focusing mirror, consisting of over two hundred concentric aluminium shells

X-rays are much harder to collect and focus than electromagnetic radiation of longer wavelengths. X-ray telescopes can use X-ray optics, such as Wolter telescopes composed of ring-shaped 'glancing' mirrors made of heavy metals that are able to reflect the rays just a few degrees. The mirrors are usually a section of a rotated parabola and a hyperbola, or ellipse. In 1952, Hans Wolter outlined 3 ways a telescope could be built using only this kind of mirror. Examples of space observatories using this type of telescope are the Einstein Observatory, ROSAT, and the Chandra X-ray Observatory. In 2012 the NuSTAR X-ray Telescope was launched which uses Wolter telescope design optics at the end of a long deployable mast to enable photon energies of 79 keV.

=== Gamma ray ===
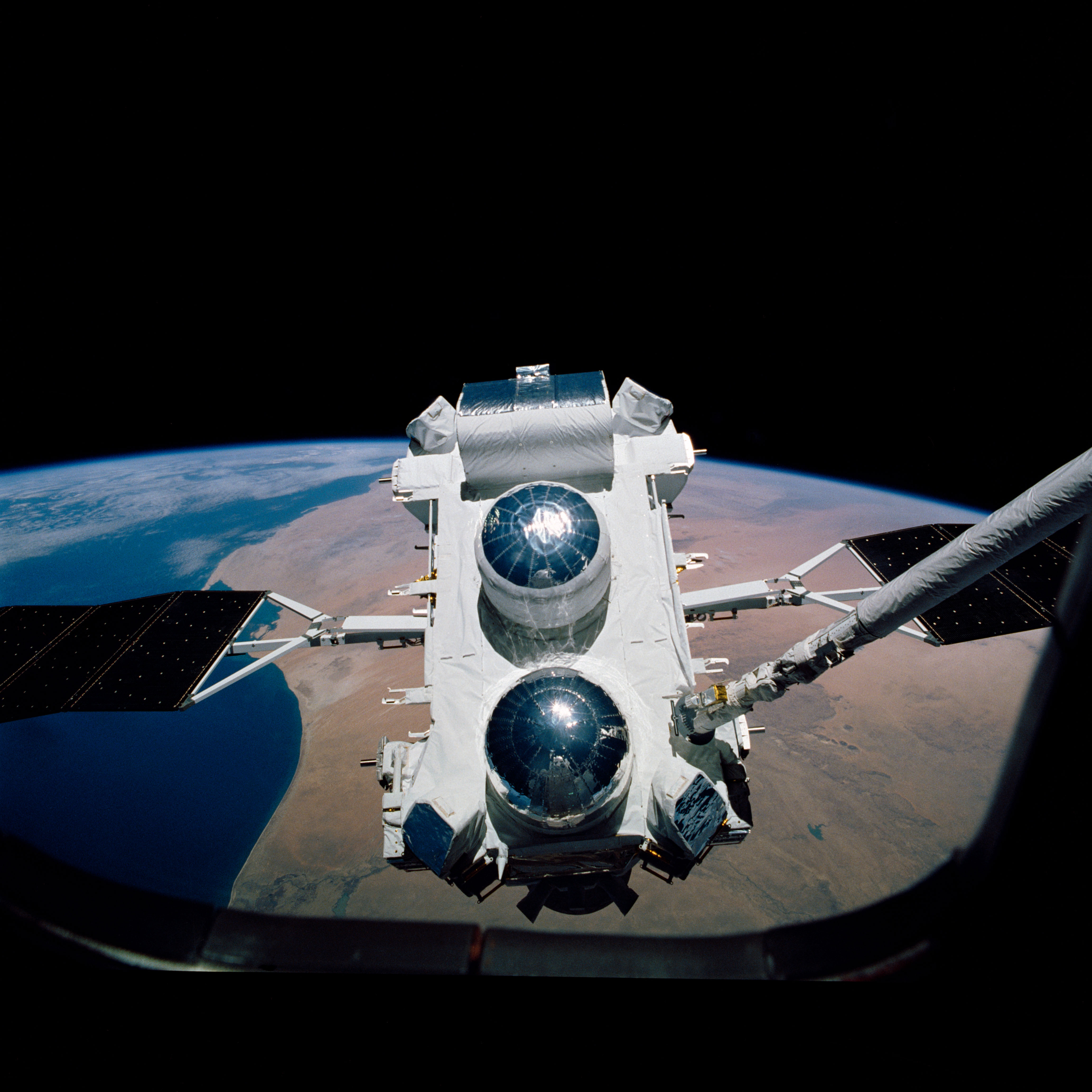
The Compton Gamma Ray Observatory released into orbit by the Space Shuttle in 1991

Higher energy X-ray and gamma ray telescopes refrain from focusing completely and use coded aperture masks: the patterns of the shadow the mask creates can be reconstructed to form an image.

X-ray and Gamma-ray telescopes are usually installed on high-flying balloons or Earth-orbiting satellites since the Earth's atmosphere is opaque to this part of the electromagnetic spectrum. An example of this type of telescope is the Fermi Gamma-ray Space Telescope which was launched in June 2008.

The detection of very high energy gamma rays, with shorter wavelength and higher frequency than regular gamma rays, requires further specialization. Such detections can be made either with the Imaging Atmospheric Cherenkov Telescopes (IACTs) or with Water Cherenkov Detectors (WCDs). Examples of IACTs are H.E.S.S. and VERITAS with the next-generation gamma-ray telescope, the Cherenkov Telescope Array (CTA), currently under construction. HAWC and LHAASO are examples of gamma-ray detectors based on the Water Cherenkov Detectors.

A discovery in 2012 may allow focusing gamma-ray telescopes. At photon energies greater than 700 keV, the index of refraction starts to increase again.

== Lists of telescopes ==
- List of optical telescopes
- List of largest optical reflecting telescopes
- List of largest optical refracting telescopes
- List of largest optical telescopes historically
- List of radio telescopes
- List of solar telescopes
- List of space observatories
- List of telescope parts and construction
- List of telescope types

== See also ==
- Airmass
- Amateur telescope making
- Angular resolution
- ASCOM open standards for computer control of telescopes
- Bahtinov mask
- Binoculars
- Bioptic telescope
- Carey mask
- Dew shield
- Dynameter
- f-number
- First light
- Hartmann mask
- Keyhole problem
- Microscope
- Planetariums
- Remote Telescope Markup Language
- Robotic telescope
- Timeline of telescope technology
- Timeline of telescopes, observatories, and observing technology
