= 1939 in science =

The year 1939 in science and technology involved some significant events, listed below.

== Astronomy ==
- Robert Oppenheimer jointly predicts two new types of celestial object:
  - With George Volkoff, he calculates the structure of neutron stars.
  - With Hartland Snyder, he predicts the existence of what will come to be called black holes.

== Biology ==
- Autumn – DDT's properties as an insecticide are discovered by Paul Müller of Geigy.

== Cartography ==
- Kavrayskiy VII projection devised by Vladimir V. Kavrayskiy.

== Chemistry ==
- January 7 – French physicist Marguerite Perey identifies francium, the last chemical element first discovered in nature, as a decay product of ^{227}Ac.
- April 30 – Nylon fabric is first introduced to the general public at the New York World's Fair.
- July – Edward Adelbert Doisy of Saint Louis University publishes the chemical structure of vitamin K.
- Linus Pauling publishes The Nature of the Chemical Bond, a compilation of a decade's work on chemical bonding, explaining hybridization theory, covalent bonding and ionic bonding as explained through electronegativity, and resonance as a means to explain, among other things, the structure of benzene.

== Computer science ==
- September 4 – Alan Turing and Gordon Welchman report to the United Kingdom Government Code and Cypher School, Bletchley Park.
- October – John V. Atanasoff with Clifford Berry demonstrate the first prototype Atanasoff–Berry Computer at Iowa State University.
- Publication of Vannevar Bush's article "Mechanization and the Record" proposing a proto-hypertext collective memory machine which he soon afterwards calls 'memex'.

== History of science and technology ==
- Cornelis de Waard begins to publish the Journaal of Isaac Beeckman.
- Philosopher and historian Alexandre Koyré originates the term Scientific Revolution to describe the emergence of modern science during the early modern period, from the late Renaissance to the late 18th century.
- Quarry Bank Mill, an 18th-century working (at this time) cotton mill in northwest England, is donated to the National Trust for Places of Historic Interest or Natural Beauty.

== Mathematics ==
- Richard von Mises poses the birthday problem in probability.

== Physics ==
- January–February – Discovery of nuclear fission is announced independently by Otto Hahn and Lise Meitner. On January 26, Niels Bohr reports the splitting of the uranium nucleus with a release of two hundred million electron volts of energy to a conference on the campus of George Washington University in Washington, D.C.
- August 2 – The Einstein–Szilard letter is signed by Albert Einstein, advising President of the United States Franklin D. Roosevelt of the potential use of uranium to construct an atomic bomb. It is delivered on October 11.
- September 1 – World War II breaks out:
  - Niels Bohr and John Archibald Wheeler's paper on "the mechanism of nuclear fission" is published.
  - The second Uranverein (Uranium Club), essentially the beginning of the German nuclear program during World War II, is founded.
- October 21 – First meeting of the Advisory Committee on Uranium under Lyman James Briggs, authorised by President Roosevelt to oversee neutron experiments.

== Physiology and medicine ==
- John H. Lawrence uses beams of energized neutrons from a particle accelerator to treat a patient with leukemia.
- Drs Philip Levine and Rufus Stetson publish a first case report on the clinical consequences of non-recognized Rh factor, hemolytic transfusion reaction and hemolytic disease of the newborn in its most severe form.
- Maudsley Hospital moves to an evacuated school in north London as the Mill Hill Emergency Hospital where treatment of combat stress is pioneered.
- Intramedullary rod is first used by German Gerhard Küntscher.

== Technology ==
- January 1 – Hewlett-Packard is founded as an electronics company in Palo Alto, California.
- January 11 – First flight of the Lockheed P-38 Lightning in the United States.
- August 27 – Flying the Heinkel He 178, Erich Warsitz makes the first flight entirely on turbojet power (the HeS 3 jet engine), at Rostock in Germany.
- November 1–2 – Physicist Hans Ferdinand Mayer writes the Oslo Report on German weapons systems and passes it to the British Secret Intelligence Service.
- December 29 – First flight of the Consolidated XB-24 "Liberator" bomber prototype in the United States.
- Homer Dudley and Robert Riesz of Bell Labs in the United States publicly demonstrate the Voder (voice operating demonstrator) speech synthesis machine.
- Kirlian photography is invented by Semyon Kirlian.
- American industrial psychologist Fritz Roethlisberger, with William J. Dickson, publishes Management and the Worker: an account of a research program conducted by the Western Electric Company, Hawthorne works, Chicago.

== Events ==
- November 6 – Sonderaktion Krakau: The Gestapo arrests scientists from the Jagiellonian University and other institutions in Kraków, Poland; on November 27 they are sent to Sachsenhausen concentration camp.

== Awards ==
- Nobel Prizes
  - Physics – Ernest Lawrence
  - Chemistry – Adolf Friedrich Johann Butenandt, Lavoslav Ruzicka
  - Medicine – Gerhard Domagk

== Births ==
- January 20 – Chandra Wickramasinghe, Ceylonese-born British astronomer.
- January 22 – Helmut Rauch (died 2019), Austrian physicist.
- April 17 – Jan Hoem (died 2017), Norwegian population scientist.
- May 12 – Chuck Hull, American inventor, pioneer of 3D printing.
- May 13 – Brian J Ford, British biologist, broadcaster, writer and lecturer.
- May 18 – Peter Grünberg (died 2018), German physicist, winner of the Nobel Prize in Physics.
- May 19 – Dick Scobee (killed 1986), American astronaut.
- June 22 – Ada Yonath (died 2026), Israeli crystallographer, winner of the Nobel Prize in Chemistry.
- June 26 – Julia Polak (died 2014), Argentine-born British pathologist and pioneer of tissue engineering.
- June 28 – Klaus Schmiegel, German-born organic chemist, inventor of Prozac.
- August 12 – David King, South African-born British physical chemist.
- August 19 – Alan Baker (died 2018), English mathematician.
- September 9 – John Dwyer, Australian public health practitioner.
- September 24 – Jacques Vallée, French ufologist.
- October 7
  - John Hopcroft, American theoretical computer scientist.
  - Harry Kroto (died 2016), English organic chemist, winner of the Nobel Prize in Chemistry.
- October 10 – Neil Sloane, Welsh-born American mathematician.
- November 7 – Barbara Liskov, American computer scientist, Turing Award winner.
- November 11 – Alf Adams, English physicist.
- November 18 – John O'Keefe, American-born British neuroscientist, winner of the Nobel Prize in Physiology or Medicine.

== Deaths ==
- February 4 – Edward Sapir (born 1884), American anthropological linguist.
- February 12 – S. P. L. Sørensen (born 1868), Danish chemist.
- March 6
  - Cuthbert Hilton Golding-Bird (born 1848), English surgeon.
  - Dorothea Pertz (born 1859), English botanist.
- April 26 – Anne Walter Fearn (born 1867), American physician.
- May 14 – Fanny Searls (born 1851), American botanist.
- July 15 – Eugen Bleuler (born 1857), Swiss psychiatrist.
- September 23 – Sigmund Freud (born 1856), Austrian-born psychoanalyst.
- October 7 – Harvey Cushing (born 1869), American neurosurgeon.
