= Sodium tetrathionate =

Sodium tetrathionate dihydrate
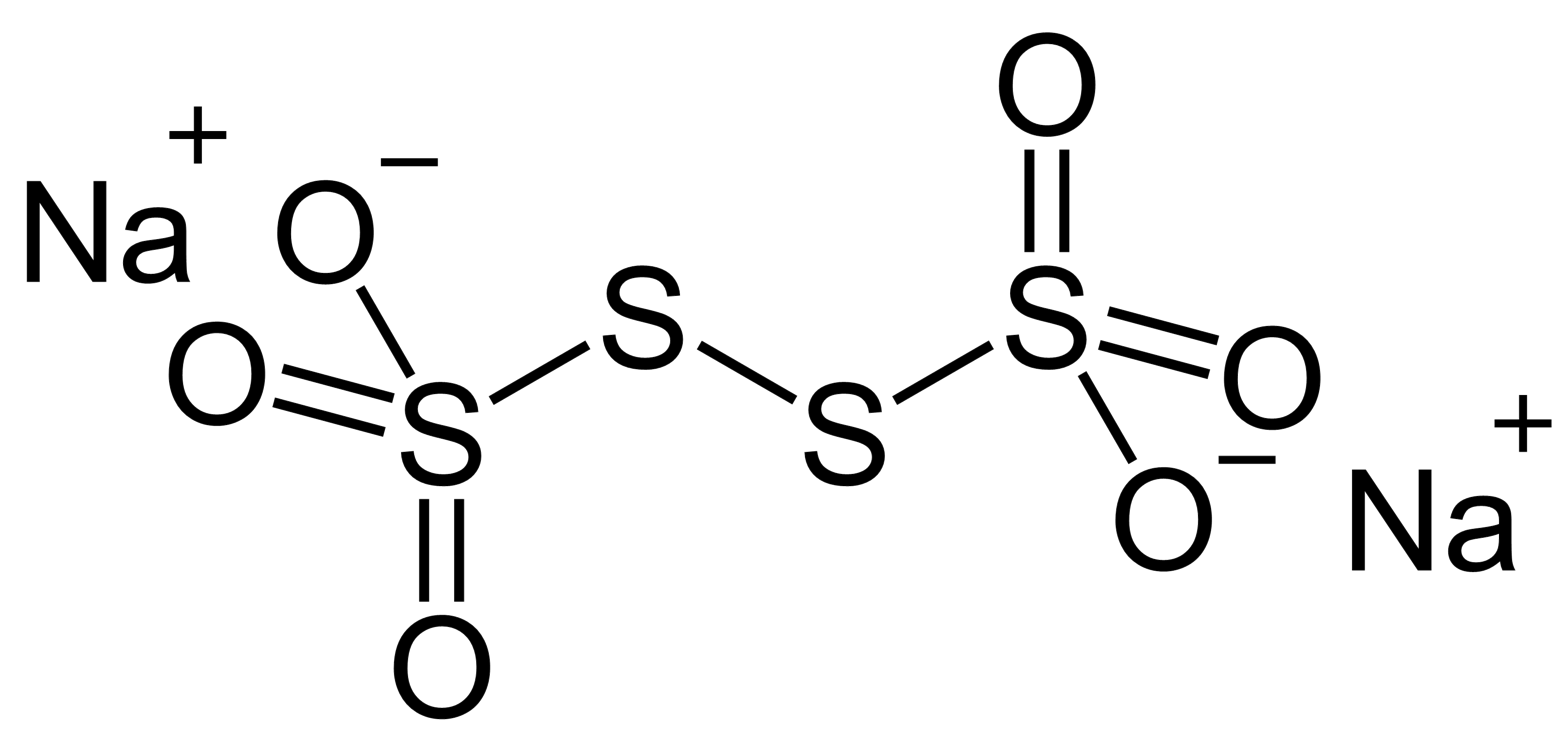

Names
- IUPAC name Sodium (sulfonatodisulfanyl)sulfonate dihydrate

Identifiers
CAS Number	dihydrate: 13721-29-4; anhydrous: 10101-86-7
3D model (JSmol)	dihydrate: Interactive image; anhydrous: Interactive image
ChemSpider	dihydrate: 175842; anhydrous: 9076918
ECHA InfoCard	100.208.917
EC Number	dihydrate: 683-390-0
PubChem CID	dihydrate: 203055; anhydrous: 10901658
CompTox Dashboard (EPA)	dihydrate: DTXSID50160108
- InChI: dihydrate: InChI=1S/2Na.H2O6S4.2H2O/c;;1-9(2,3)7-8-10(4,5)6;;/h;;(H,1,2,3)(H,4,5,6);2*1H2/q2*+1;;;/p-2 Key: HAEPBEMBOAIUPN-UHFFFAOYSA-L; anhydrous: InChI=1S/2Na.H2O6S4/c;;1-9(2,3)7-8-10(4,5)6/h;;(H,1,2,3)(H,4,5,6)/q2*+1;/p-2 Key: TYSODIVRTHAMGD-UHFFFAOYSA-L
- SMILES: dihydrate: O.O.[O-]S(=O)(=O)SSS(=O)(=O)[O-].[Na+].[Na+]; anhydrous: [O-]S(=O)(=O)SSS(=O)(=O)[O-].[Na+].[Na+]

Properties
Chemical formula	Na_{2}S_{4}O_{6}
Molar mass	306.2665 g/mol (dihydrate)
Appearance	white powder
Density	2.1 g/mL (25 °C)
Solubility in water	30.6 g/L (20 °C)

Hazards
NFPA 704 (fire diamond)	2 0 0
- Except where otherwise noted, data are given for materials in their standard state (at 25 °C [77 °F], 100 kPa). Infobox references

Sodium tetrathionate is a salt of sodium and tetrathionate with the formula Na_{2}S_{4}O_{6}^{.}xH_{2}O. The salt normally is obtained as the dihydrate (x = 2). It is a colorless, water-soluble solid. It is a member of the polythionates, which have the general formula [S_{n}(SO_{3})_{2}]^{2-}. Other members include trithionate (n = 1), pentathionate (n = 3), hexathionate (n = 4).

Sodium tetrathionate is formed by the oxidation of sodium thiosulfate (Na_{2}S_{2}O_{3}), e.g. by the action of iodine:

2 Na_{2}S_{2}O_{3} + I_{2} → Na_{2}S_{4}O_{6} + 2 NaI

The reaction is signaled by the decoloration of iodine. This reaction is the basis of iodometric titrations.

Other methods include the coupling of sodium bisulfite with disulfur dichloride:

2 NaHSO_{3} + S_{2}Cl_{2} → Na_{2}S_{4}O_{6} + 2 HCl

The ion has ideal C_{2} symmetry, like H_{2}S_{2}. The S-S-S dihedral angle is nearly 90°. The central S-S distance is 2.115 Å, 0.01 Å longer than the two other S-S distances as well as those distances in most polysulfanes.

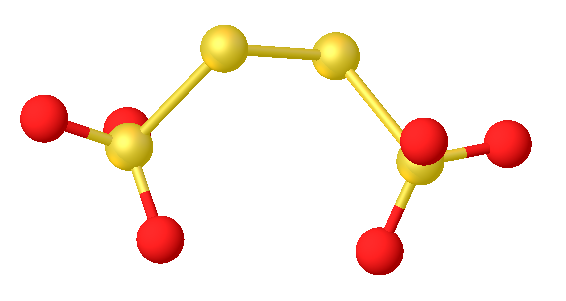
Structure of tetrathionate as its dihydrated sodium salt.
