= Zacharias Janssen =

Dutch optician

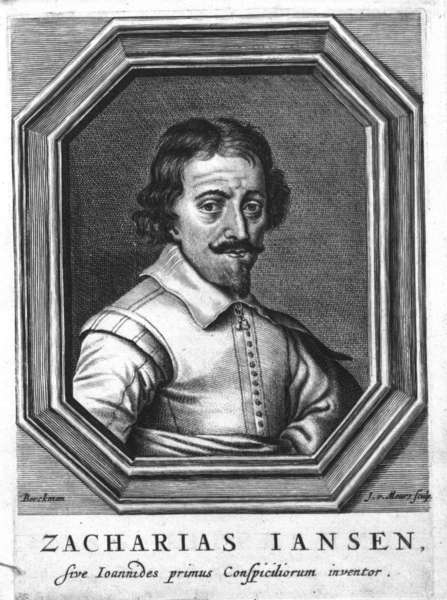
- Zacharias Janssen
- Born: 1585 (1580); The Hague
- Died: Given as before 1632 (sometimes 1638); Amsterdam
- Other names: Zacharias Jansen, Sacharias Jansen
- Occupation: Spectacle-maker (sometimes counterfeiter)
- Known for: Possible inventor of the microscope and the telescope (posthumous claim)
- Parents: Hans Mertens (father); Mayken Provoost Bacher (mother)

Zacharias Janssen; also Zacharias Jansen or Sacharias Jansen; (1585 – pre-1632) was a Dutch spectacle-maker who lived most of his life in Middelburg. He is associated with the invention of the first optical telescope and/or the first truly compound microscope, but these claims (made 20 years after his death) may be fabrications put forward by his son.

== Biography ==
Zacharias Janssen was born in The Hague. Local records seem to indicate he was born in 1585 although a date of birth as early as 1580 or as late as 1588 are also given. His parents were Hans Martens (who may have been a peddler) and Maeyken Meertens, both probably from Antwerp, Belgium. He grew up with his sister Sara in Middelburg, at the time the second most important city of the Netherlands. He was known as a "street seller" who was constantly in trouble with the local authorities.

He stated he was born in The Hague on the marriage file of his first marriage, with Catharina de Haene, on October 23, 1610. When this file was refound by Cornelis de Waard in 1906, De Waard found the following excerpt: Sacharias Jansen, j.g. uut Den Haag, "Zacharias Jansen, bachelor from The Hague" Before, it was often thought that Janssen was a native of Middelburg. In 1612, Zacharias and Catharina had a son they named Johannes Zachariassen.

In 1615 Zacharias was appointed guardian of two children of Lowys Lowyssen "geseyt Henricxen brilmakers" (called Henry the spectacle maker). It is surmised that Zacharias also took possession of Lowys Lowyssen's spectacle-making tools because the first record of Zacharias Janssen being a spectacle maker appears in 1616. The family had to move to Arnemuiden in 1618 after Zacharias's counterfeiting activities were exposed. There Zacharias was again accused of counterfeiting in 1619, causing him to be on the move again, ending up back in Middelburg in 1621.

A year after the death of Janssen's first wife in 1624, he married Anna Couget from Antwerp, who was the widow of a Willem Jansen (probably a relative of Janssen). He moved to Amsterdam in November 1626 with a profession of a spectacle maker, but was bankrupt by 1628. Janssen has been given a death date as late as 1638 although his sister said he was dead in 1632 testimony and his son Johannes declared his parents had died by the time of his marriage in April 1632.

== Alleged invention of the telescope and microscope ==
Over the years there have been claims Zacharias Janssen invented the telescope and/or the microscope in Middelburg between 1590 and 1618. Zacharias worked for some time in the very competitive and secretive trade of spectacle-making and at one time lived next door to Middelburg spectacle maker Hans Lippershey, who is also claimed to have invented the telescope. Janssen's attribution to these discoveries is debatable since there is no concrete evidence as to the actual inventor, and there are a whole series of confusing and conflicting claims from the testimony of his son and fellow countrymen.

The claim that Zacharias Janssen invented the telescope and the microscope dates back to the year 1655. During that time Dutch diplomat Willem Boreel conducted an investigation trying to figure out who invented the telescope. He had a local magistrate in Middelburg follow up on a 45 year old recollection of a spectacle maker named "Hans" who told a young Boreel in 1610 about inventing the telescope. In his investigation the magistrate was contacted by a then unknown claimant, Middelburg spectacle maker Johannes Zachariassen, the son of Zacharias Janssen, who testified under oath that his father invented the telescope and the microscope as early as 1590 and that Hans Lippershey had stolen his father's invention of the telescope. This testimony seemed convincing to Boreel, who modified his recollections, concluding that Zacharias must have been who he remembered. Boreel's conclusion that Zacharias Janssen invented the telescope a little ahead of spectacle maker Hans Lippershey was adopted by Pierre Borel in his 1656 book on the subject.

In Boreel's investigation Johannes also claimed his father, Zacharias Janssen, invented the compound microscope in 1590. For this to be true (Zacharias most likely dates of birth would have made him 2–5 years old at the time) some historians concluded grandfather Hans Martens must have invented it.

Other claims have come forward over the years. Physicist Jean Henri van Swinden's 1822-23 investigation reached the conclusion supporting Janssen and in 1841 a collector named Zacharias Snijder came forward with 4 iron tubes with lenses in them purported to be Janssen original telescopes. In historian Cornelis de Waard's 1906 book on the history of the telescope he recounted his discovery of a note written in 1634 by the Dutch philosopher Isaac Beeckman in which Beeckman mentioned that Johannes Zachariassen claimed his father created his first telescope in 1604 (and that it was a copy of an Italian device from 1590). The German astronomer Simon Marius's account to his patron Johan Philip Fuchs von Bimbach about meeting an unnamed Dutchman at the 1608 Autumn Frankfurt Fair who tried to sell him a device that sounded like a broken telescope has led to later speculation this unnamed Dutchman could have been Zacharias Janssen.

=== Controversy ===
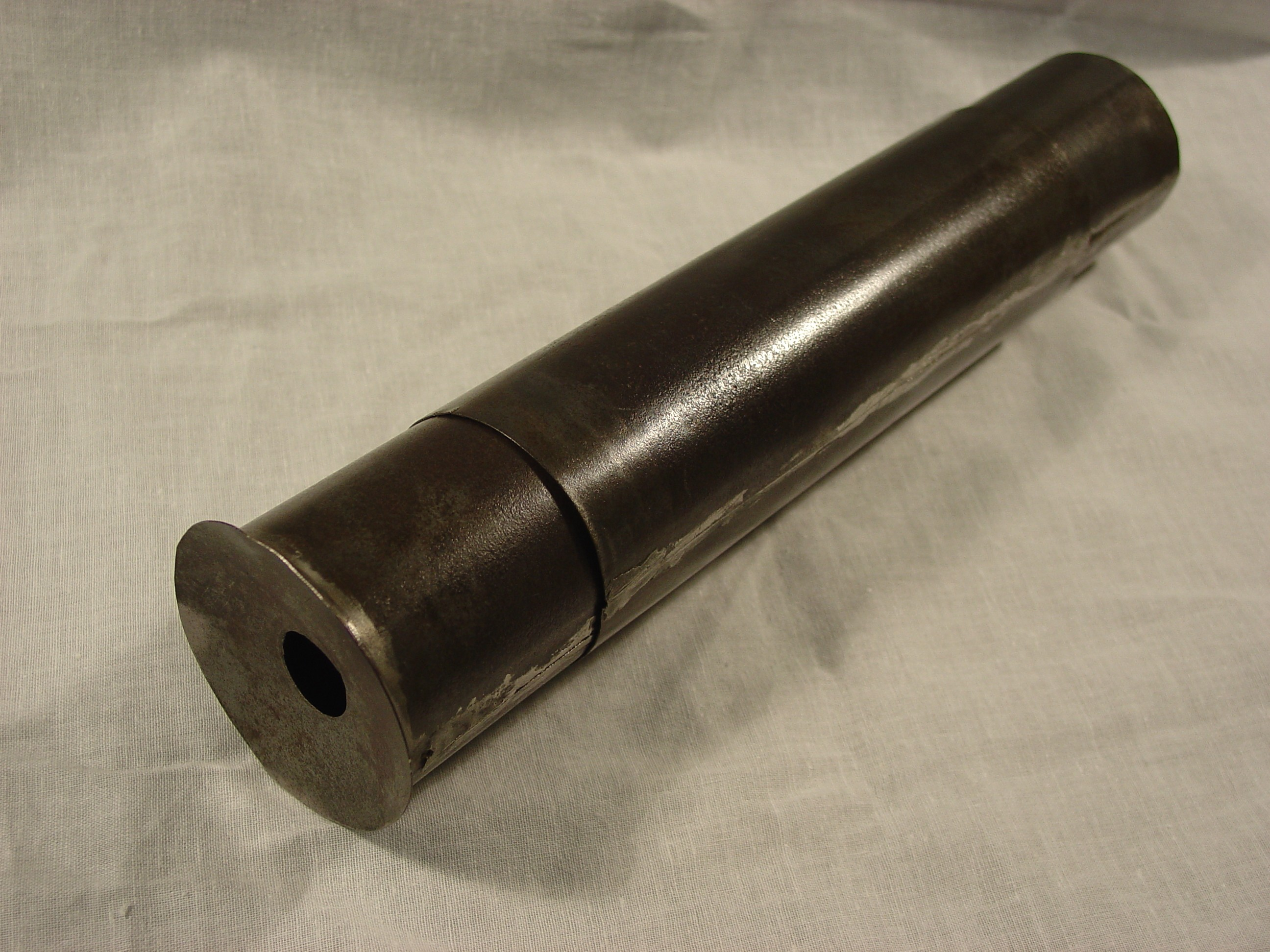
Reproduction of an optical device that Zacharias Snijder in 1841 claimed was an early telescope built by Jansen. Dutch biologist and naturalist Pieter Harting claimed in 1858 that this was an early microscope which he also attributed to Janssen, perpetuating the Janssen claim to both devices. Its actual function and creator has been disputed.

The confusion surrounding the claim to invention of the telescope and the microscope arises in part from the (sometimes conflicting) testimony of Zacharias Janssen's son, Johannes Zachariassen. Johannes' various claims include that his father invented the telescope in 1590, that his father invented the telescope in 1604, that in 1618 he and his father invented the Keplerian telescope (a design using two positive lenses proposed by Johannes Kepler in 1611), and that (Adriaan) Metius and Cornelis Drebbel bought a telescope from him and his father in 1620 and copied it. Johannes also seems to have lied about his own date of birth, maybe so he could stake his own claim as inventor of the telescope along with his father.

The 1655 investigation by William Boreel (who may have been a childhood friend of Zacharias Zachariassen) added to the confusion over invention. The people he had the local magistrate interview were trying to recount details 50 or 60 years after the fact and Boreel may have confused the names of spectacle makers from his childhood. He may have also been confused about a microscope built by another optician for Drebbel, claiming it was built by Zacharias Janssen.

An investigation begun in 1816 in preparation for a memorial to commemorate Janssen as the inventor of the telescope and microscope turned up further problems with the claim including the 1608 Lippershey and Metius patent applications, Janssen late 1585 date of birth, and no record of him being a spectacle maker before 1615.

Albert Van Helden, Sven Dupré, Rob Van Gent, and Huib Zuidervaart in their book "Origins of the Telescope" came to the conclusion that Janssen may not have become an optician until 1616 and that the claims surrounding him as the inventor of the telescope and the microscope were the fabrications of his own son, Johannes Zachariassen, who claimed it as a matter of fame and for possible financial gain.

== Illegal activities ==
In the years 1613–1619, Janssen was tried several times for counterfeiting coins. Janssen grew up right next to the Middelburg mint where his brother-in-law worked. These circumstances made it very easy for Janssen to mimic the process of producing fake money. He fled to the neighbouring village of Arnemuiden to avoid the high penalties for counterfeiting coins.

However, he continued counterfeiting coins in Arnemuiden. In 1619 he was apprehended for owning several devices he counterfeited coins with. Normally, one would have been sentenced to death for this crime. However, since the father of the Arnemuiden bailiff was found to be an accessory, he was pardoned from this punishment. Thanks to this, the process was delayed to such an extent that Janssen was able to flee again. Eventually, the case was dismissed. Janssen returned to Middelburg in 1621.

== Historical record ==
Janssen's life was documented by the many investigations on the subject before the Second World War. Many of the Middelburg archives were destroyed by a bombing of Middelburg on May 17, 1940, during the Nazi invasion of the Netherlands. Without these earlier studies, very little would be known of Janssen's life at all because all original files were lost in the fires following the bombardment.

== Legacy ==
The super-Earth 55 Cancri Ae was given the proper name "Janssen" in his honor.
