= Polythionates =

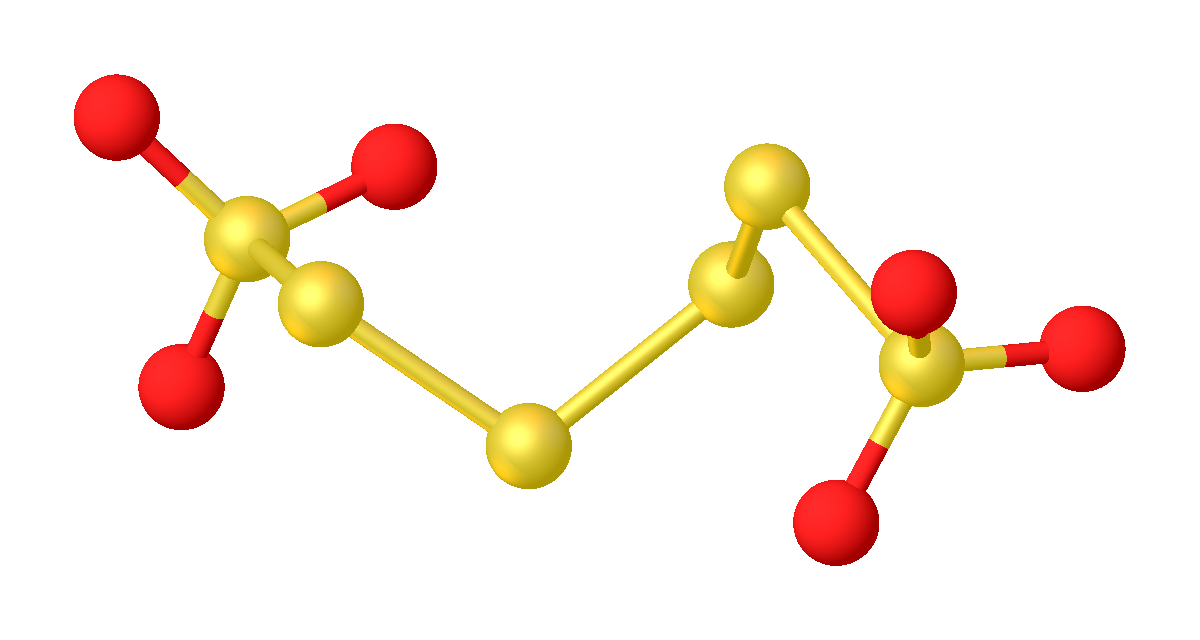
Structure of the hexathionate dianion.

Polythionates are oxyanions with the formula ^{−}O_{3}S−S_{n}−SO^{−}_{3} (n ≥ 0). They occur naturally and are the products of redox reactions of thiosulfate. Polythionates are readily isolable, unlike the parent polythionic acids.

== Preparation ==
Many members of the polythionates have been characterized: dithionate, trithionate, tetrathionate, pentathionate, etc.

These salts are often generated by oxidation of thiosulfate. For example, tetrathionate is obtained by oxidation of thiosulfate ion with iodine (reaction is used in iodometry):

2 S_{2}O^{2−}_{3} + I_{2} → S_{4}O^{2−}_{6} + 2 I^{−}

Practical laboratory routes involve reactions of sulfur chlorides with sulfurous acid]] followed by neutralization as illustrated by this preparation of potassium tetrathionate:

S_{2}Cl_{2} + 2 H_{2}SO_{3} → HO_{3}SSSO_{3}H + 2 HCl
H_{2}S_{4}O_{6} + 2 KOH → K_{2}S_{4}O_{6} + 2 KCl

Potassium pentathionate ion has been obtained from SCl_{2}, sodium thiosulfate, and potassium acetate. Initially prismatic crystals of potassium tetrathionate appear, then lamellar crystals of potassium pentathionate, from which the influence of tartaric acid makes an aqueous solution of pentathionic acid.

Potassium hexathionate K_{2}S_{6}O_{6} has been synthesized by combining KNO_{2} and K_{2}S_{2}O_{3} in concentrated HCl at low temperatures.
