= Jacob Metius =

Jacob (Jacobus; sometimes James) Metius (after 1571–1628) was a Dutch instrument-maker and a specialist in grinding lenses. He is primarily known for the patent application he made for an optical telescope in October 1608, a few weeks after Hans Lippershey submitted a patent for the same device. He was the brother of the geometer and astronomer Adriaan Metius.

== Biography ==
Little is known of Jacob Metius other than he lived his life in Alkmaar. His father was Adriaan Anthonisz, a mathematician/map-maker/military engineer and Alkmaar burgomaster, and his brother was Adriaan Metius. Jacob's date of birth was some time after his brother's (1571). He died in Alkmaar, his death date usually given in sources as 1628 although some put it between 1624 and 1631.

== Invention of the telescope ==
In October 1608, the States General discussed Jacob Metius's patent application for a device for "seeing faraway things as though nearby", consisting of a convex and concave lens in a tube, and the combination magnified three or four times. His use of a convex objective lens and concave eyepiece may have been a superior design to the Lippershey telescope design which was submitted for patent only a few weeks before Metius's.

Metius informed the States General that he was familiar with the secrets of glassmaking and that he could make an even better telescope with the government's support. The States General voted him a small award, although it ended up employing Lippershey to make binocular versions of the telescope. Metius is described as feeling rebuffed by the States General, withdrawing his patent, and not allowing anyone to see his telescope. His will and testament ordered that all his tools and designs be destroyed to prevent anyone else from profiting from them.

There is a claim by Johannes Zachariassen, Zacharias Janssen's son, that Janssen had invented the telescope and that (Adriaan) Metius and Cornelis Drebbel had bought a telescope from him and his father in 1620 and copied it, although this claim is put in doubt since Adriaen Metius was using telescopes by 1613, Drebbel had described them in 1609, and Jacob Metius had tried to patent one in 1608.

== See also ==
- List of astronomical instrument makers
