= Pieter Harting =

Dutch biologist (1812–1885)

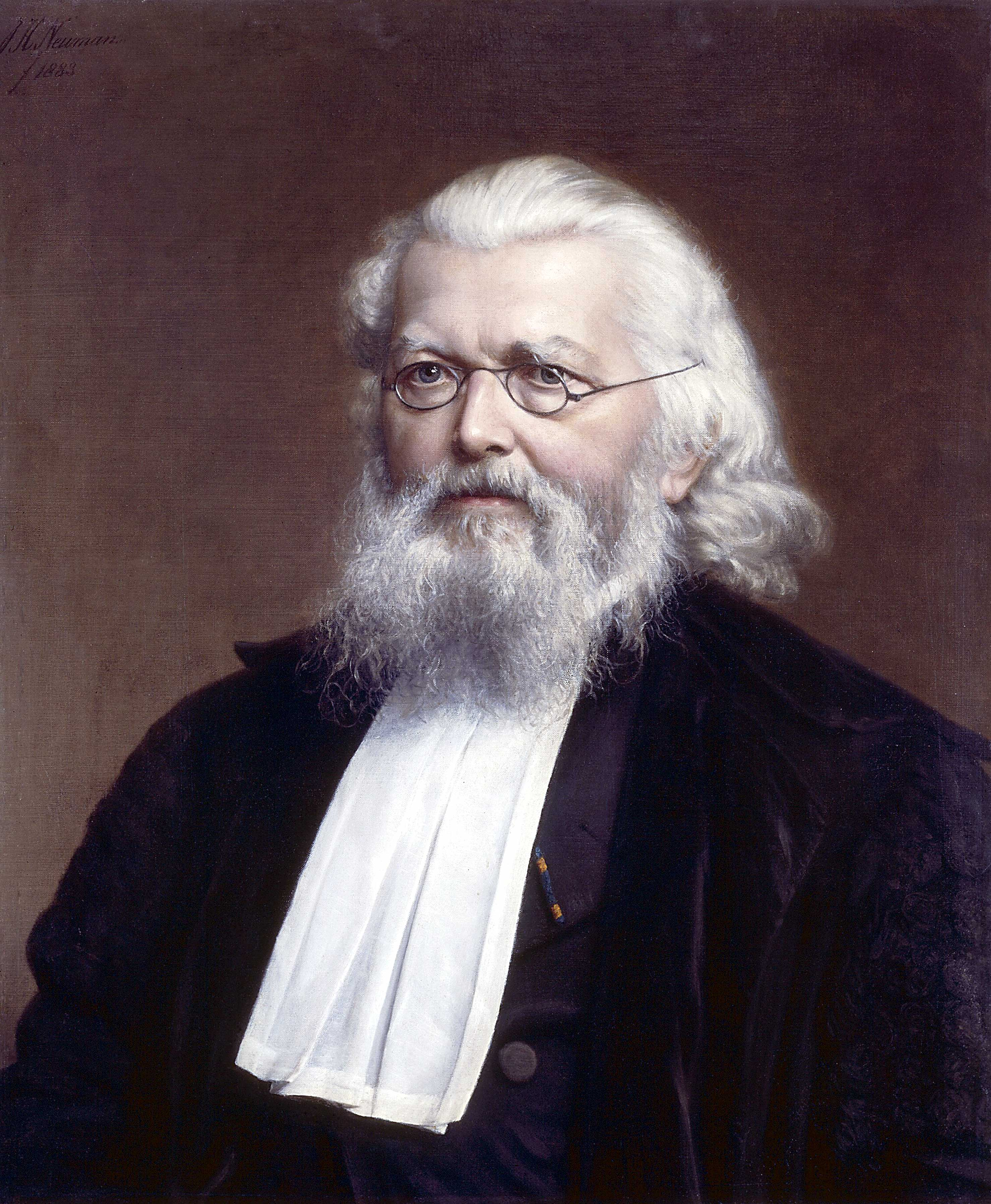
Pieter Harting (1812-1885)

Pieter Harting (27 February 1812 – 3 December 1885) was a Dutch biologist and naturalist, born in Rotterdam. He made contributions in a number of scientific disciplines, and is remembered for his work in the fields of microscopy, hydrology, botany, and biostratigraphy.

== Career ==
=== Medicine and teaching ===
In 1835 he obtained his medical degree from the University of Utrecht and spent the following years as a doctor in Oudewater.

From 1841 he taught classes in medicine at the Athenaeum of Franeker, and two years later returned to the University of Utrecht, where he worked until retirement in 1875. At Utrecht he was a full professor of pharmacology and plant physiology (from 1846), and later zoology (from 1855). In 1856 he was appointed director of the zoological museum.

=== Microscope ===
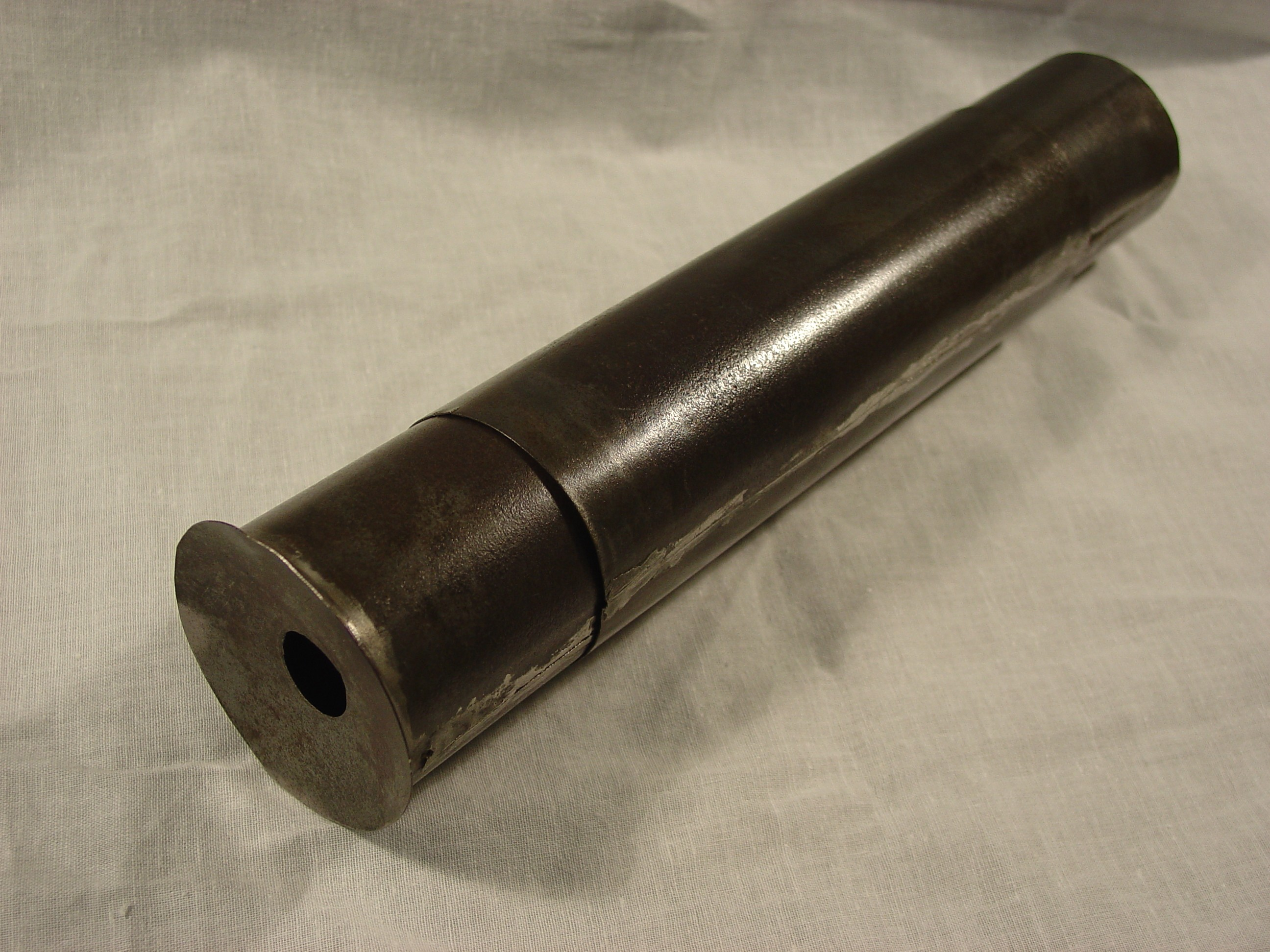
Reproduction of the "Snijder tube". Pieter Harting claimed in 1858 that this was an early microscope which he attributed to Sacharias Jansen. Its actual function and creator has been disputed.

Throughout his career he maintained an avid interest in the historical development of the microscope and in the manufacture of lenses. He is credited with making design improvements to the microscope, and was the author of a landmark book on microscopy that was translated into several languages, including German (Das Mikroskop, 1859 by Friedrich Wilhelm Theile). At Utrecht he established a popular microscopy laboratory for students.

=== Hydrology and geological cartography ===
In the field of hydrology he conducted extensive scientific groundwater research in an effort to improve the quality of water for public health. In collaboration with other scientists he formed the first committee for creation of a geological map of the Netherlands.

== Views and legacy ==
He was a member of Royal Netherlands Academy of Arts and Sciences (KNAW) and was awarded an honorary doctorate from the University of Leiden. Harting was one of the first Dutch scholars to accept the theory of evolution and was important supporter of Charles Darwin. He died in Amersfoort on 3 December 1885. The settlement of Hartingsburg in the Transvaal was named in his honor (later renamed Warmbad), as is a species of squid, Architeuthis hartingii.
