= Sébastien Basson =

French physician and natural philosopher (c. 1573–1625)

Sébastien Basson, Latinized as Sebastianus Basso, was a French physician and natural philosopher of the beginning of the seventeenth century. He was an early theorist of a matter theory based on both atoms and compounds. His natural philosophy draws on several currents of thought, including Italian Renaissance naturalism, alchemy and Calvinist theology. Basson was an atomist, who, independently from Isaac Beeckman, formed the concept of "molecule".

== Biography ==
Basson was born in the area of Metz in Lorraine around 1573 and studied at the Jesuit academy of Pont-à-Mousson, where he took philosophy courses under Pierre Sinson. Where he obtained his doctorate in medicine is unknown and we have no sign of medical activity during his life. At some stage, but before 1610, he converted to Calvinism and got married in Lausanne, Switzerland. From 1611 to 1625, he taught rhetoric at the small Calvinist academy of Die-en-Dauphiné. In 1620, he had to appear before the board of theologians at Geneva in order to defend his anti-Aristotelian treatise, whose printing the censors had stopped. After tensions with the academic senate at Die had been rising for some years, he left the town in anger in 1625. Where he went and when he died is unknown.

== Philosophy ==
Basson's Philosophiae naturalis adversus Aristotelem libri XII (Twelve books of natural philosophy against Aristotle) of 1621, was strongly against the conception of natural philosophy as based on Aristotle; it attacked in particular the concept of continuous magnitude. Ivor Leclerc considers this work the fullest expression of the “new conception of nature” that had arisen in Europe by the 1620s, at the hands of Francis Bacon, Galileo Galilei, David van Goorle, and Daniel Sennert.

For Basson, atoms may combine as mixta, but they are not in a void, but rather in an ether. They are moved by it; in this suggestion Basson contradicts the teleology of the Jesuit view of causation. The theory of his time on the classical elements tended towards a version with five principles, but Basson rejected earth and water in his book, leaving his elemental theory as three Paracelsian principles. He opposed, though, the theory of "compounds", as admitted by Sennert, in the sense of mixtures having properties that were not properties of their atomistic constituents.

Some contemporaries—both adversaries and sympathizers—have set up lists of the proponents of new ideas during the early seventeenth century. All those "novateurs" keenly felt the deficiencies of Aristotelianism and the oppressiveness of tradition. Most of them were young (Galileo is a notable exception) and had a youthful and aggressive voice. There is the place of Basson.

== Work ==
- Philosophiae naturalis adversus Aristotelem libri XII, in quibus abstrusa Veterum physiologia restauratur et Aristotelis errores solidis rationibus refelluntur (Natural philosophy against Aristotle, in twelve books, where the secret physiology of the Ancients is restored and Aristotle's errors are confuted with solid reasons) (in Latin)
  - Philosophiae naturalis adversus Aristotelem libri XII…. Amsterdam, Louis Elzevir 1649—The quotes in the article are taken from this 1649 edition.
  - Antonio Lamara; Roberto Palaia (eds.), Philosophiae naturalis adversus Aristotelem libri XII…. L.S. Olschki, 2009. Anastatic reprint of the edition published at Geneva in 1621

== Notes and references ==
- Ariew, Roger. Descartes, Basson et la scolastique renaissante. In Descartes et la Renaissance, edited by E. Faye (Geneva: Slatkine, 1999), pp. 295–309. (in French)
- Ariew, Roger. "Basso, Sebastian". In Roger Ariew, Dennis Des Chene, Douglas M. Jesseph, Tad M. Schmaltz, Theo Verbeek, The A to Z of Descartes and Cartesian philosophy. Scarecrow Press, 2010, p. 35 ISBN 9781461671855
- Leclerc, Ivor. The necessity today of the philosophy of nature
- Lüthy, Christoph. "Thoughts and circumstances of Sébastien Basson. Analysis, micro-history, question". In Early Science and Medicine, 2 (1997), p. 1-73; Stanford Encyclopedia of Philosophy, Atomism from the 17th to the 20th Century
