= Heinrich Wilhelm Ferdinand Wackenroder =

German chemist (1798–1854)

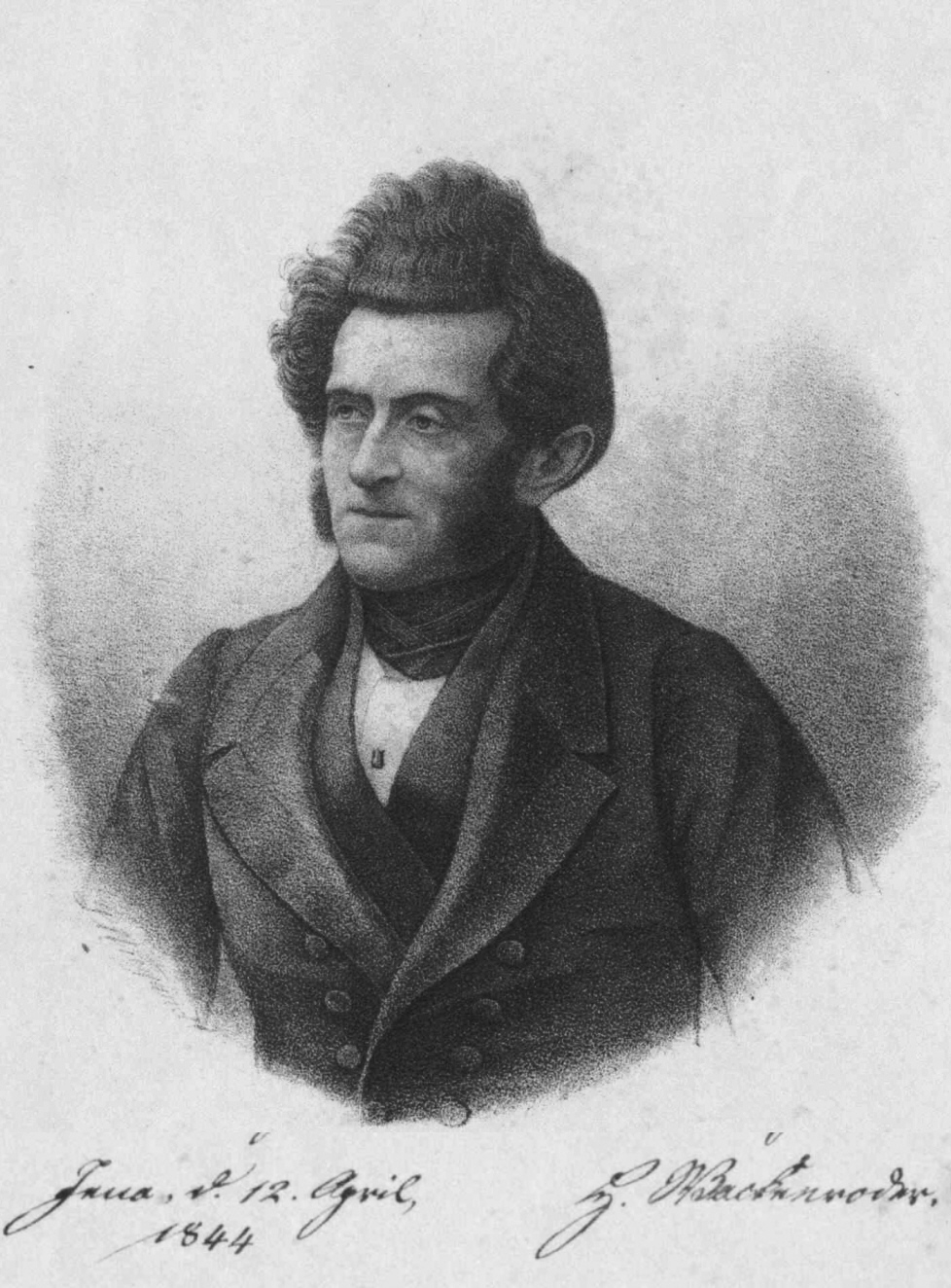
- Born: 8 March 1798; Burgdorf, Hanover
- Died: 4 September 1854 (aged 56); Jena
- Known for: Wackenroder solution
- Scientific career
- Fields: Chemistry

Heinrich Wilhelm Ferdinand Wackenroder (8 March 1798 in Burgdorf, Hanover – 4 September 1854 in Jena) was a German chemist.

== Career and work ==
In June, 1826 Wackenroder published his doctoral dissertation, “On Anthelminthics in the Vegetable Kingdom,” presented to Göttingen University, which earned him praise, and the Royal Prize.

In 1827 he obtained his doctorate from the University of Erlangen, becoming an associate professor the following year at the University of Jena, where he worked with Johann Wolfgang Döbereiner (1780–1849). In 1829, he re-established the Pharmacy Institute in Jena (founded 1821) with Friedrich Wilhelm Theile and Prof. Wahl. In 1836, he was appointed Director of the Pharmacy Institute, later known as the Chemical-Pharmaceutical Institute. In 1838 he was appointed as an honorary Professor ordinarius at the university. He became especially known for his discovery of carotin and his correspondence with Goethe. In subsequent years he became co-editor of Archiv der Pharmazie.

In 1826 Wackenroder isolated corydalin from Corydalis cava and in 1831 isolated carotin in an ether extract from carrots. In 1845 he discovered the Wackenroder solution, a polythionic acid, resulting from the reaction of aqueous sulphur dioxide with hydrogen sulphide.

== Writings ==
- Chemische Tabellen zur Analyse der unorganischen Körper (1829)
- Synoptische Tabellen über die chemischen Verbindungen erster Ordnung (1830)
- Ausführliche Charakteristik der wichtigsten Stickstoffreihen organischer Säuren (1841)
- Chemische Klassifikation der einfachen und zusammengesetzten Körper und die wichtigsten Verbindungen derselben (1851)

== Other sources ==
- Carl Oppenheimer (1896). "Wackenroder, Heinrich Wilhelm Ferdinand" . Allgemeine Deutsche Biographie (in German). Vol. 40. Leipzig: Duncker & Humblot. pp. 443–444.
- Wolfram Wendler: Der akademische Unterricht in der Pharmazie um die Mitte des 19. Jahrhunderts : dargestellt an der Mitschrift einer Vorlesung Heinrich Wilhelm Ferdinand Wackenroders aus dem Jahre 1845. Diss. Marburg 2004
