= Trithionic acid =

Names
- IUPAC names: Thiodisulfuric acid; 1,5-Dihydrido-2,2,4,4-tetraoxido-1,5-dioxy-2,3,4-trisulfy-[5]catena; Trithionic acid

Identifiers
CAS Number	27621-39-2
3D model (JSmol)	Interactive image
ChEBI	CHEBI:29210
ChEMBL	ChEMBL3754893
ChemSpider	KRURGYOKPVLRHQ-UHFFFAOYSA-N
PubChem CID	492
CompTox Dashboard (EPA)	DTXSID90182006
- InChI: InChI=1S/H2O6S3/c1-8(2,3)7-9(4,5)6/h(H,1,2,3)(H,4,5,6) Key: KRURGYOKPVLRHQ-UHFFFAOYSA-N
- SMILES: OS(=O)(=O)SS(=O)(=O)O

Properties
Chemical formula	H_{2}O_{6}S_{3}
Molar mass	194.19 g·mol^{−1}
Density	2.4±0.1 g/cm^{3}
Melting point	324.41 °C (615.94 °F; 597.56 K)
Boiling point	739.35 °C (1,362.83 °F; 1,012.50 K)
Solubility in water	1.0·10^{6} mg/L
log P	−1.1
Vapor pressure	1.07·10^{−16} Pa (8.05·10^{−19} mm Hg)
Acidity (pK_{a})	−6.94
Conjugate base	Hydrogen trithionate
Refractive index (n_{D})	1.700

Pharmacology
- Pharmacokinetics
Biological half-life	0.570 hours
- Except where otherwise noted, data are given for materials in their standard state (at 25 °C [77 °F], 100 kPa). Infobox references

Trithionic acid is a polythionic acid with three sulfur atoms. It can be viewed as two bisulfite radicals bridged by a sulfur atom.
