= Louis Delasiauve =

French psychiatrist

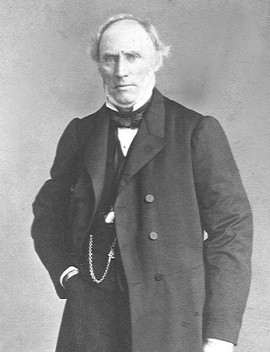
Louis Delasiauve

Louis Jean François Delasiauve (14 October 1804, in Garennes-sur-Eure – 5 June 1893, in Paris) was a French psychiatrist.

In 1830 he earned his doctorate in Paris, and for the next eight years practiced medicine in Ivry-la-Bataille. Afterwards he worked at the Bicêtre Hospital, and later became a director at the Salpêtrière, where he worked with epileptic and mentally handicapped patients. One of his better known assistants was Désiré-Magloire Bourneville (1840–1909).

Delasiauve was a pioneer of child psychiatry, and an advocate of education for the mentally handicapped. He is best known for his research of epilepsy, being credited for describing three distinct types of the disease:

- Idiopathic epilepsy: Absence of physical lesions; fundamentally a true neurotic disorder.
- Symptomatic epilepsy: Cerebral lesions being present; convulsions being a symptom and not the disease.
- Sympathetic epilepsy: Produced by the irradiation of abnormal impressions which can have their seat in all parts of the body except the central nervous system.

His book Traité de l'épilepsie; histoire, traitement, médecine légale was translated into German by anatomist Friedrich Wilhelm Theile as Die Epilepsie (1855).
