= Klaas van Berkel =

Dutch historian of science

Klaas van Berkel (born 24 July 1953) is a Dutch historian, historian of science, and professor of Modern History at the University of Groningen in the Netherlands, known from his work on the history of science in the Netherlands, particularly the work of Isaac Beeckman, Simon Stevin and Eduard Jan Dijksterhuis.

== Life ==
Born in Nieuwer-Amstel, Van Berkel studied history and philosophy at the University of Groningen, and in 1983 he received his PhD at the University of Utrecht with a dissertation, entitled "Isaac Beeckman (1588-1637) en de mechanisering van het wereldbeeld" (Isaac Beeckman (1588-1637) and the mechanization of the world view).

Afterwards, he worked as a research assistant at the Open University and taught history of science at the Agricultural University at Wageningen. In 1988 he was appointed Professor of Modern History at the University of Groningen as a successor to Ernst Kossmann. From 1992 to 1999 he was director of the Rudolf Agricola Institute.

Since 1988 Van Berkel is also editor for several magazines and in various administrative positions and committees. In 1997 Klaas van Berkel was elected member of the Royal Netherlands Academy of Arts and Sciences (KNAW).

== Selected publications ==
- 1981, Natuurwetenschappen van Renaissance tot Darwin. Thema's uit de wetenschapsgeschiedenis, met H.A.M. Snelders (ed.).
- 1983, Isaac Beeckman (1588-1637) en de mechanisering van het wereldbeeld.
- 1985, In het voetspoor van Stevin. Geschiedenis van de natuurwetenschap in Nederland 1580-1940, Meppel: Boom.
- 1998, Dijksterhuis: een biografie, Bert Bakker Amsterdam.
- 1999, A history of science in the Netherlands: survey, themes and reference, with Albert van Helden en Lodewijk Palm, Brill Leiden.
- 2005, Academische illusies. De Groningse universiteit in een tijd van crisis, bezetting en herstel, 1930-1950 Bert Bakker, Amsterdam
- 2008, De stem van de wetenschap Geschiedenis van de Koninklijke Nederlandse Akademie van Wetenschappen. Deel I 1808-1914 Bert Bakker, Amsterdam
