= Trithionate =

Names
- IUPAC name 2,2,4,4-tetraoxido-1,5-dioxy-2,3,4-trisulfy-[5]catenate(2−)

Identifiers
CAS Number	15579-17-6
3D model (JSmol)	Interactive image
ChEBI	CHEBI:15987
ChemSpider	477
Gmelin Reference	142337
KEGG	C01861
PubChem CID	491
CompTox Dashboard (EPA)	DTXSID20165968
- InChI: InChI=1S/H2O6S3/c1-8(2,3)7-9(4,5)6/h(H,1,2,3)(H,4,5,6)/p-2 Key: KRURGYOKPVLRHQ-UHFFFAOYSA-L
- SMILES: [O-][S+2]([O-])([O-])S[S+2]([O-])([O-])[O-]

Properties
Chemical formula	O_{6}S_{3}^{−2}
Molar mass	192.18 g·mol^{−1}
Conjugate acid	Trithionic acid
- Except where otherwise noted, data are given for materials in their standard state (at 25 °C [77 °F], 100 kPa). Infobox references

Trithionate is an oxyanion of sulfur with the chemical formula S_{3}O^{2−}_{6}. It is the conjugate base of trithionic acid. Dilute sodium hydroxide hydrolyzes S_{4}N_{4} as follows, yielding sodium thiosulfate and sodium trithionate:

2 S_{4}N_{4} + 6 NaOH + 9 H_{2}O → Na_{2}S_{2}O_{3} + 2 Na_{2}S_{3}O_{6} + 8 NH_{3}

Certain sulfate-reducing bacteria have been known to use the compound in respiration.
