= Friedrich Wilhelm Theile =

German physician and anatomist

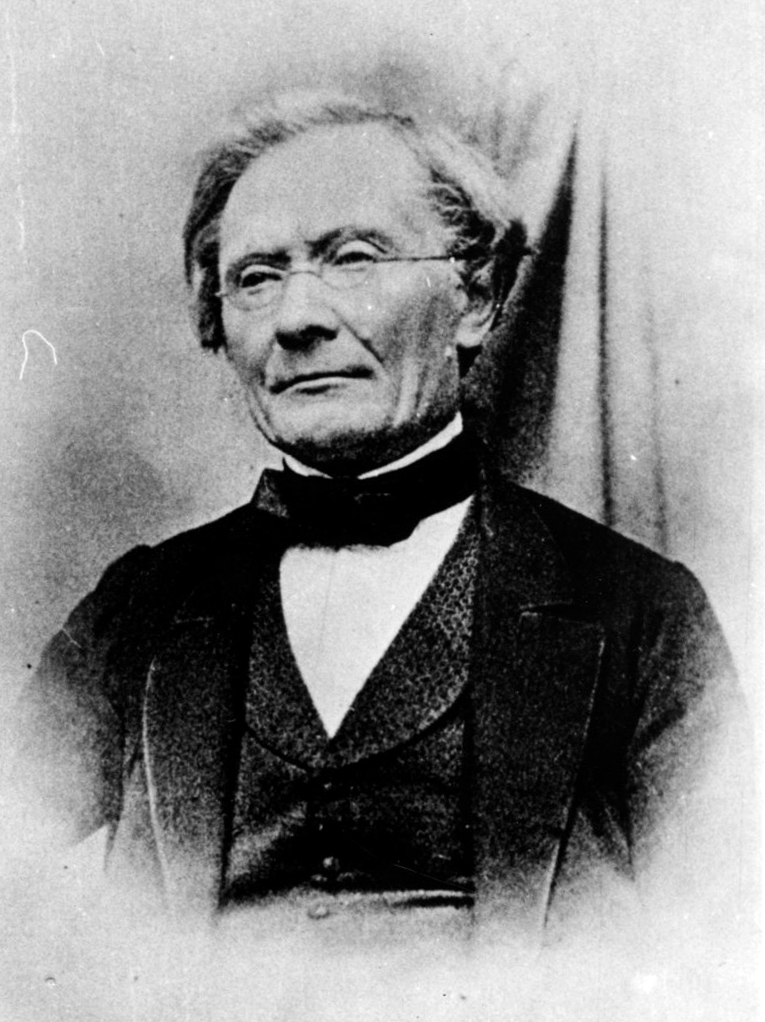
Friedrich Wilhelm Theile

Friedrich Wilhelm Theile (11 November 1801, in Buttstädt – 20 October 1879, in Weimar) was a German medical doctor and anatomist.

In 1825 he received his medical doctorate from the University of Jena with the dissertation-thesis De Musculis nervisque laryngeis. From 1828, with Heinrich Wilhelm Ferdinand Wackenroder, he was in charge of the pharmaceutical institute at Jena. In 1831 he became an associate professor, and three years later relocated to the University of Bern as a full professor of anatomy. From 1853 he practiced medicine in Weimar, during which time, he largely concerned himself with literary activities.

== Selected works ==
- Lehre von den Muskeln und Gefäßen des menschlichen Körpers, Volume 3 of the 2nd edition of Samuel Thomas von Soemmerring's Vom Bau des menschlichen Körpers, 1841 – On the muscles and blood vessels of the human body.
- Anatomische Untersuchungen eines Hypospadeus, In: Archiv für Anatomie, Physiologie und wissenschaftliche Medicin, Berlin, 1847: 17-32 – Anatomical investigations of hypospadias.

In addition to his own writings, he translated several works by foreign physicians and scientists — Louis Delasiauve, Franciscus Cornelis Donders, Auguste Ambroise Tardieu, Pieter Harting and Jacobus Schroeder van der Kolk.

== Eponymy ==
- "Theile's canal": the transverse pericardial sinus.
- "Theile's glands": the glands of biliary mucosa.
- "Theile's muscle": the superficial transverse perineal muscle.
