= Cornelis de Waard =

Cornelis de Waard (born 19 August 1879 in Bergen op Zoom, died in Vlissingen on 6 May 1963) was a Dutch mathematics teacher and a historian who specialized in researching science and mathematics of the seventeenth century.

== Biography ==
De Waard studied mathematics and physics in Amsterdam and was then a teacher in The Hague, Winschoten, and from 1909 until retirement in 1944, lived in Vlissingen.

== Historical work ==
De Waard was particularly concerned with mathematicians of the first half of the 17th century such as René Descartes, Pierre de Fermat, Gilles Personne de Roberval, Blaise Pascal, Girard Desargues. He discovered and published several original writings of scholars of the seventeenth century, including 8 volumes of the correspondence Marin Mersenne and the journals of Isaac Beeckman. He assisted Étienne Gilson in the preparation of his edition of Descartes's Discourse on the Method. In his 1906 "De uitvinding der verrekijkers" ("The Discovery of the Telescope"), one of the first modern works on the subject, he put forward evidence that supported Middelburg spectacle-maker Zacharias Janssen as the inventor of the device.

== Published works ==
- "De uitvinding der verrekijkers" (The Hague, 1906) ("The Discovery of the Telescope")
- The expedition of Cornelis Evertsen the Younger
- L'experience barometrique. Ses antecedents et ses explications, (Imprimerie Nouvelle, Thouars, 1936) A historical study
- (in collaboration with Paul Tannery and Charles Henry) Works of Fermat (1891–1922, 5 vols.), Paris.
- (in collaboration of Paul Tannery and René Pintard) Correspondence of P. Marin Mersenne, minor religious (1932–1988), Presses universitaires de France, XVII volumes
- Journal of Isaac Beeckman from 1604 to 1634 (1939–1953, 4 vols.), Ed. Martinus Nijhoft, The Hague.
