= Polythionic acid =

Family of sulfur oxoacids

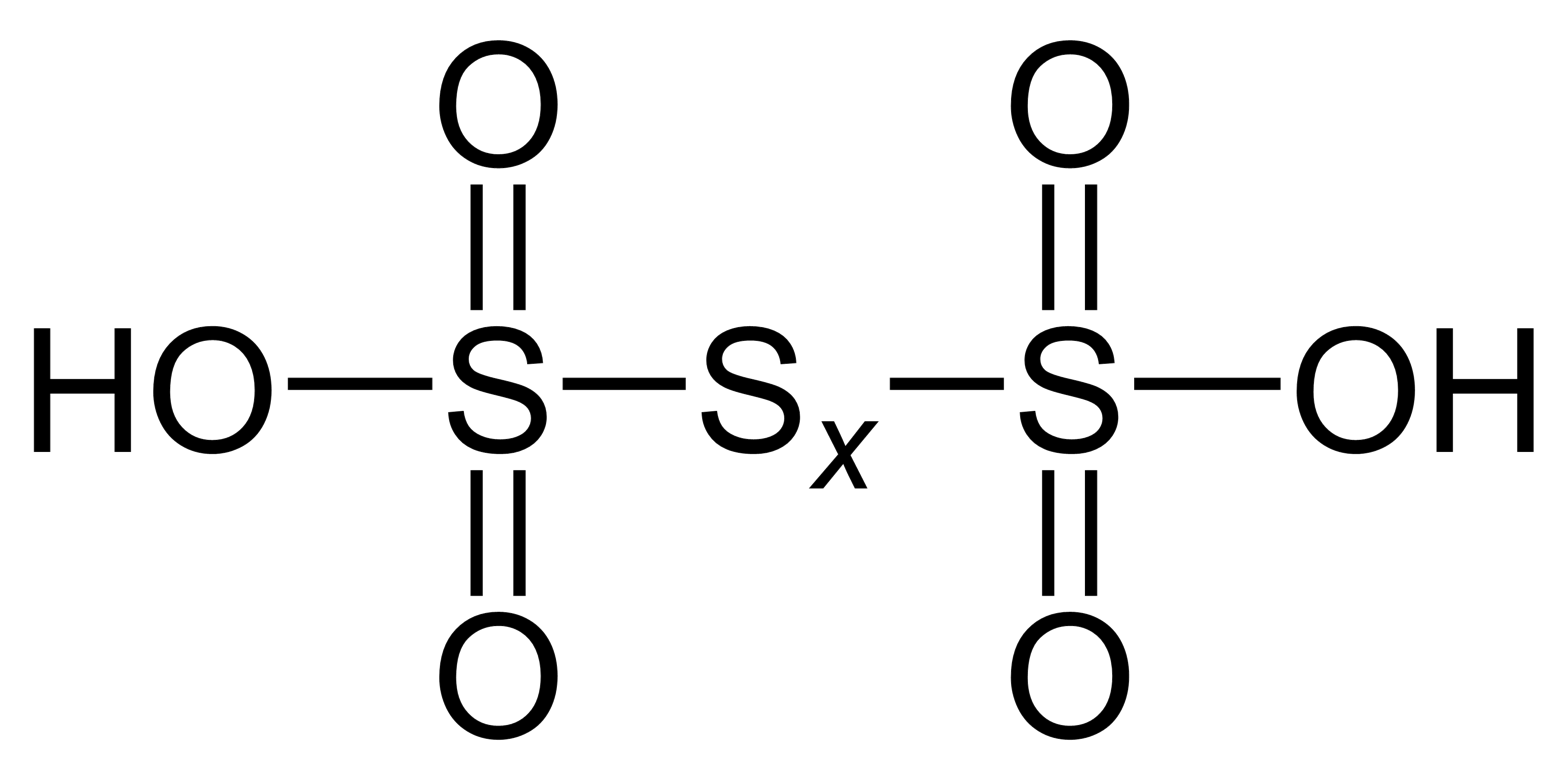
Skeletal formula of polythionic acid

Polythionic acids are a family of oxoacids which has a straight chain of sulfur atoms and has the chemical formula S_{n}(SO_{3}H)_{2} (n > 0). Trithionic acid (H_{2}S_{3}O_{6}), tetrathionic acid (H_{2}S_{4}O_{6}) are simple examples. They are the conjugate acids of polythionates. The compounds of n < 80 are expected to exist, and those of n < 20 have already been synthesized. Dithionic acid (H_{2}S_{2}O_{6}) does not belong to the polythionic acids due to strongly different properties.

== Nomenclature ==
All polythionates anion contains chains of sulfur atoms attached to the terminal SO_{3}H-groups. Names of polythionic acids are determined by the number of atoms in the chain of sulfur atoms:

- H_{2}S_{2}O_{6} – dithionic acid
- H_{2}S_{3}O_{6} – trithionic acid
- H_{2}S_{4}O_{6} – tetrathionic acid
- H_{2}S_{5}O_{6} – pentathionic acid, etc.

== History ==
Numerous acids and salts of this group have a venerable history, and chemistry systems, where they exist, dates back to the studies John Dalton devoted to the behavior of hydrogen sulfide in aqueous solutions of sulfur dioxide (1808). This solution now has the name of Heinrich Wilhelm Ferdinand Wackenroder, who conducted a systematic study (1846). Over the next 60–80 years, numerous studies have shown the presence of ions, in particular tetrathionate and pentathionate anion (S_{4}O^{2−}_{6} and S_{5}O^{2−}_{6}, respectively).

== Preparation and properties ==
H_{2}S react with SO_{3} or HSO_{3}Cl, forming thiosulfuric acid H_{2}S_{2}O_{3}, as the analogous reaction with H_{2}S_{2} forms disulfonomonosulfonic acid HS_{2}SO_{3}H; similarly polysulfanes H_{2}S_{n} (n = 2–6) give HS_{n}SO_{3}H. Reactions from both ends of the polysulfane chain lead to the formation of polysulfonodisulfonic acid HO_{3}SS_{n}SO_{3}H.

Many methods exist for the synthesis of these acids, but the mechanism is unclear because of the large number of simultaneously occurring and competing reactions such as redox, chain transfer, and disproportionation. Typical examples are:

- Interaction between hydrogen sulfide and sulfur dioxide in highly dilute aqueous solution. This yields a complex mixture of various oxyacids of sulfur of different structures, called Wackenroder solution. At temperatures above 20 °C solutes slowly decomposes with separation unit sulfur, sulfur dioxide, and sulfuric acid.

H_{2}S + H_{2}SO_{3} → H_{2}S_{2}O_{2} + H_{2}O
H_{2}S_{2}O_{2} + 2 H_{2}SO_{3} → H_{2}S_{4}O_{6} + 2 H_{2}O
H_{2}S_{4}O_{6} + H_{2}SO_{3} → H_{2}S_{3}O_{6} + H_{2}S_{2}O_{3}

- Reactions of sulfur halides with HSO^{−}_{3} or HS_{2}O^{−}_{3}, for example :

SCl_{2} + 2 HSO^{−}_{3} → [O_{3}SSSO _{3}]^{2−} + 2 HCl
S_{2}Cl_{2} + 2 HSO^{−}_{3} → [O_{3}SS_{2}SO_{3}]^{2−} + 2 HCl
SCl_{2} + 2 HS_{2}O^{−}_{3} → [O_{3}SS_{3}SO_{3}]^{2−} + 2 HCl

Anhydrous polythionic acids can be formed in diethyl ether solution by the following three general ways:

HS_{n}SO_{3}H + SO_{3} → H_{2}S_{n+2}O_{6} (n = 1, 2 ... 8)
H_{2}S_{n} + 2 SO_{3} → H_{2}S_{n+2}O_{6} (n = 1, 2 ... 8)
2 HS_{n}SO_{3}H + I_{2} → H_{2}S_{2n+2}O_{6} + 2 HI (n = 1, 2 ... 6)

Polythionic acids with a small number of sulfur atoms in the chain (n = 3, 4, 5, 6) are the most stable. Polythionic acids are stable only in aqueous solutions, and are rapidly destroyed at higher concentrations with the release of sulfur, sulfur dioxide and - sometimes - sulfuric acid. Acid salts of polythionic acids do not exist, unlike neutral salts. Polythionate ions are significantly more stable than the corresponding acids.

Under the action of oxidants (potassium permanganate, potassium dichromate) polythionic acids and their salts are oxidized to sulfate, and the interaction with strong reducing agents (amalgam of sodium) converts them into sulfites and dithionites.

== Occurrence ==
Polythionic acids are rarely encountered, but polythionates are common and important.

Polythionic acids have been identified in crater lakes. The phenomenon may be useful to predict volcanic activity.
