= Rudolph Snellius =

Dutch linguist and mathematician

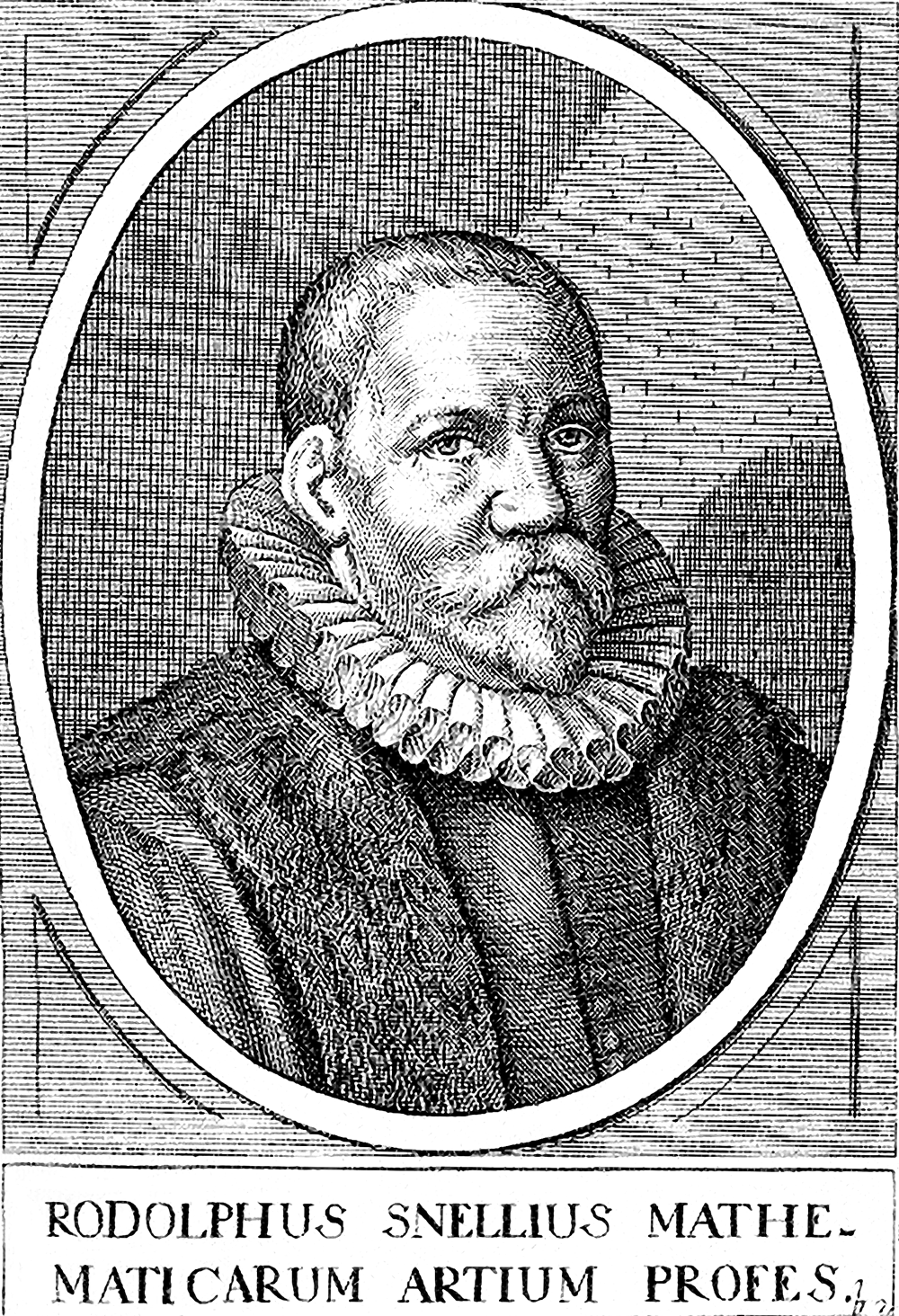
- 17th century portrait of Snellius
- Born: Rudolph Snel van Royen; 5 October 1546; Oudewater, Habsburg Netherlands
- Died: 2 March 1613 (aged 66); Leiden, Dutch Republic
- Spouse: Machteld Cornelisdochter
- Children: Willebrord Snellius
- Scientific career
- Notable students: Isaac Beeckman; Adriaan Metius

Rudolph Snel van Royen (5 October 1546 – 2 March 1613), Latinized as Rudolphus Snellius, was a Dutch linguist and mathematician who held appointments at the University of Marburg and the University of Leiden. Snellius was an influence on some of the leading political and intellectual forces of the Dutch Golden Age.

== Life ==
Rudolph Snel van Royen was born on 5 October 1546 in Oudewater. Born to a wealthy family in Episcopal principality of Utrecht while this province was under the dominion of the emperor Charles V, Rudolf Snel grew up in the city of Oudewater.

At maturity he left to study at the University of Cologne under Valentin Naboth and at the University of Heidelberg under Immanuel Tremellius and soon received a teaching position at the University of Marburg. Though trained in Aristotelian logic, he had become impressed with the new logic of Petrus Ramus, which he taught along with mathematics and languages at his university posts.

In 1578, he returned to Oudewater soon after its devastation in a Spanish siege during the Dutch Revolt. It was not long before he was offered, and accepted, a position as professor of Hebrew and mathematics at the University of Leiden. That summer he married Machteld Cornelisdochter, who had survived the Oudewater massacre. She accompanied him to Leiden, where he taught until his death in 1613. He was the father of Willebrord Snellius (1580–1626).

Snellius died on 2 March 1613 and was buried in the Grote kerk in his hometown Oudewater.

== Influence ==
While visiting Utrecht in 1575, he befriended the young Jacobus Arminius, then an impoverished student in Oudewater who would accompany him back to Marburg to take up his studies. Arminius, too, would return to Leiden to teach, and his theological doctrines would have an effect on the Reformation in Holland and beyond. Another student of Snellius, this time at Leiden, was the child prodigy Hugo Grotius, who would not only become involved in the political battles surrounding Arminius, but would later establish himself as a founding political theorist of the early modern age. Jacob Dircksz de Graeff, who later became burgomaster of Amsterdam, lived in the house of Snellius while he was studying classical language at Leiden.

His son Willebrord was the astronomer and mathematician who gave his name to Snell's law.
