= Tetrathionate =

Chemical compound

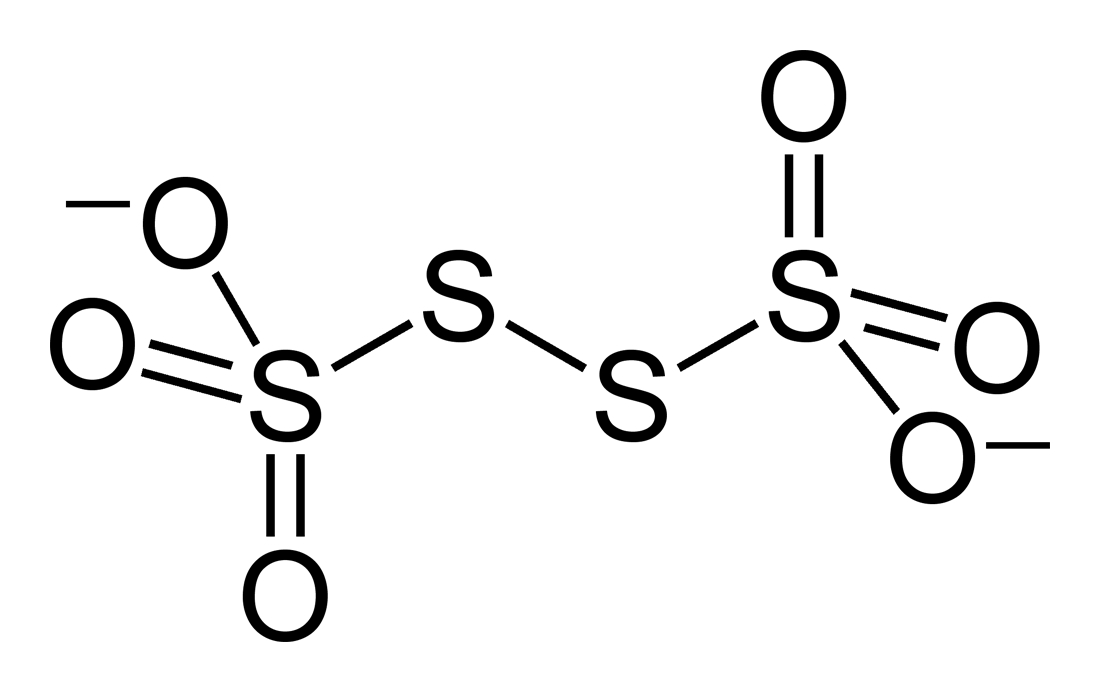
The structure of the tetrathionate anion

The tetrathionate anion, S_{4}O_{6}^{2−}, is a sulfur oxyanion derived from the compound tetrathionic acid, H_{2}S_{4}O_{6}. Two of the sulfur atoms present in the ion are in oxidation state 0 and two are in oxidation state +5. Alternatively, the compound can be viewed as the adduct resulting from the binding of S_{2}^{2−} to SO_{3}. Tetrathionate is one of the polythionates, a family of anions with the formula [S_{n}(SO_{3})_{2}]^{2−}. Its IUPAC name is 2-(dithioperoxy)disulfate, and the name of its corresponding acid is 2-(dithioperoxy)disulfuric acid. The Chemical Abstracts Service identifies tetrathionate by the CAS Number 15536-54-6.

== Formation ==
Tetrathionate is formally a product of the oxidation of thiosulfate, S_{2}O_{3}^{2−}, e.g., by iodine, I_{2}:

2 S_{2}O_{3}^{2−} + I_{2} → S_{4}O_{6}^{2−} + 2 I^{−}

A laboratory preparation entails reaction of sulfurous acid with sulfur monochloride to give tetrathionic acid, which can be neutralized to give various salts:

2 H_{2}SO_{3} + S_{2}Cl_{2} → H_{2}S_{4}O_{6} + 2 HCl
H_{2}S_{4}O_{6} + 2 KOH → K_{2}S_{4}O_{6} + 2 KCl

== Structure ==
Tetrathionate's structure can be visualized by following three edges of a rectangular cuboid, as in the diagram below. The structure shown is the configuration of S_{4}O_{6}^{2−} in BaS_{4}O_{6}·2H_{2}O and Na_{2}S_{4}O_{6}·2H_{2}O. Dihedral S–S–S–S angles approaching 90° are common in polysulfides.

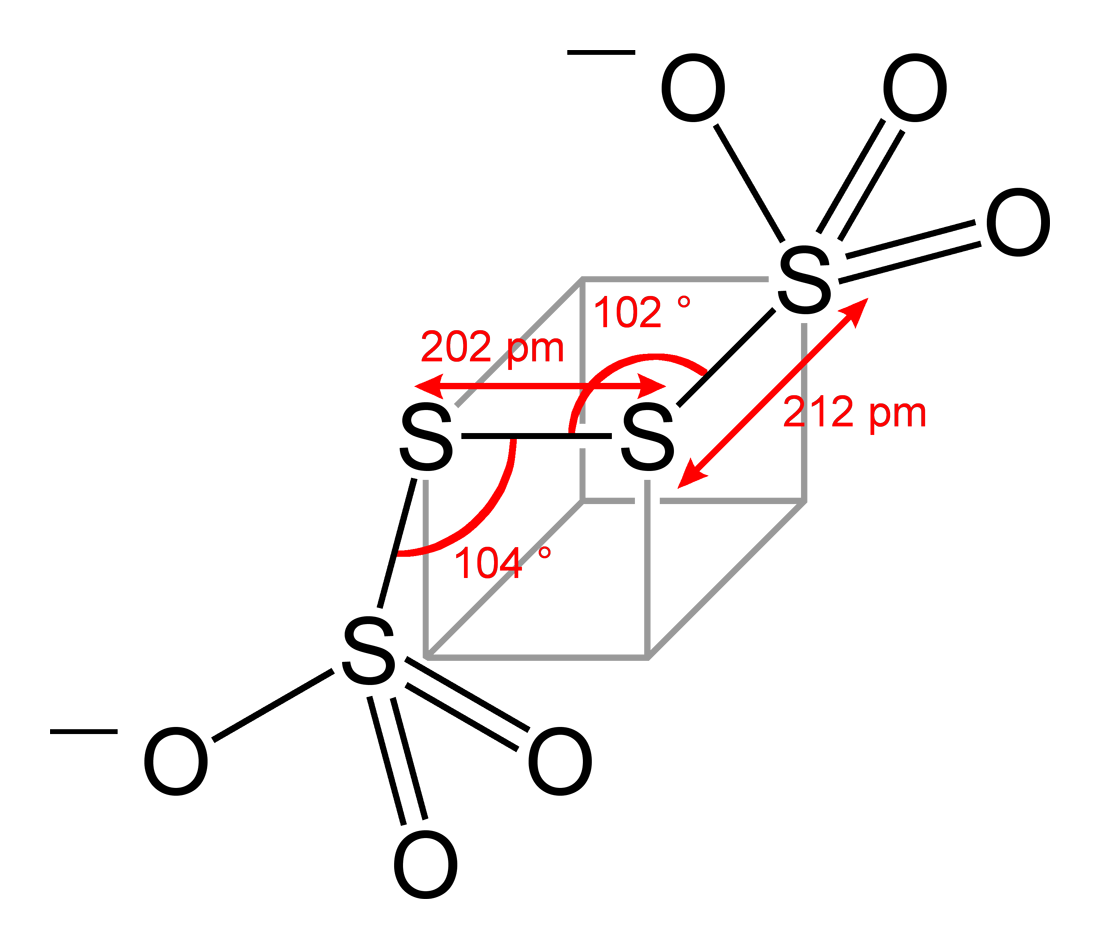
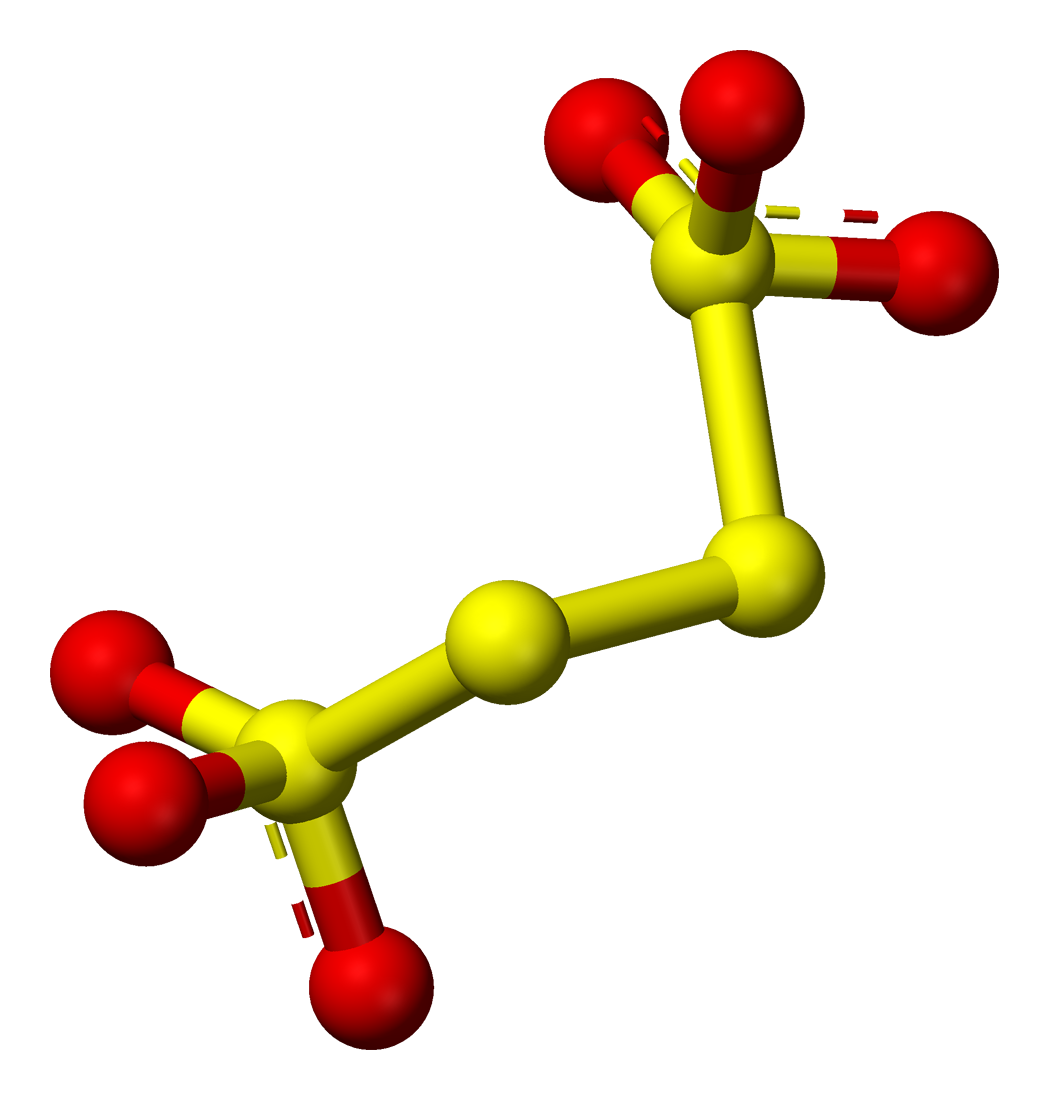

== Compounds ==
Compounds containing the tetrathionate anion include sodium tetrathionate, Na_{2}S_{4}O_{6}, potassium tetrathionate, K_{2}S_{4}O_{6}, and barium tetrathionate dihydrate, BaS_{4}O_{6}·2H_{2}O.

== Properties ==
As other species of sulfur at intermediate oxidation state, such as thiosulfate, tetrathionate can be responsible for the pitting corrosion of carbon steel and stainless steel.

Tetrathionate has also been found to serve as a terminal electron acceptor for Salmonella enterica serotype Typhimurium, whereas existing thiosulfate in the small intestines of mammals is oxidized by reactive oxygen species released by the immune system (mainly NADPH oxidase produced superoxide) to form tetrathionate. This aids in the growth of the bacterium, helped by the inflammatory response.

== See also ==
- Corrosion
- Dithionite
- Polysulfides
- Thiosulfate
- Oxyanion
