= Isaac Beeckman =

Dutch philosopher and scientist (1588–1637)

- Born: 10 December 1588; Middelburg, County of Zeeland, Dutch Republic
- Died: 19 May 1637 (aged 48); Dordrecht, County of Holland, Dutch Republic
- Education: Leiden University
- Known for: Corpuscularian natural philosophy
- Scientific career
- Fields: Natural philosophy, mathematics, mechanics
- Academic advisors: Rudolph Snellius; Simon Stevin
- Notable students: René Descartes; Johan de Witt

Isaac Beeckman (10 December 1588 – 19 May 1637) was a Dutch philosopher and scientist, who, through his studies and contact with leading natural philosophers, may have "virtually given birth to modern atomism".

== Biography ==
Beeckman was born in Middelburg, Zeeland, to a strongly Calvinistic family, which had fled from the Spanish-controlled Southern Netherlands a few years before. He had a strong early education in his home town and went on to study theology, literature and mathematics in Leiden. Upon his return to Middelburg he could not find a position as a minister, due to clashing ideas of his father and the local church, and decided to follow his father in the candle-making business, setting up his own company in Zierikzee. While trying to improve on the candle-making process, he also involved himself in other projects, like creating water conduits and doing meteorological observations. In 1616 he sold the business to his apprentice and went to study medicine in Caen, where he graduated in 1618. On his return, he became an assistant rector at the Latin school of Utrecht. On April 1620 he married Cateline de Cerf, whom he knew from Middelburg, and with whom he would have seven children. From 1620 to 1627 he taught at the Latin school of Rotterdam, where he founded a "Collegium Mechanicum", or Technical College. From 1627 until his death at the age of 48 he was rector of the Latin school of Dordrecht.

== Teachers, pupils, and Descartes ==
Beeckman's most influential teachers in Leiden probably were Rudolph Snellius and Simon Stevin. He himself was a teacher to Johan de Witt and a teacher and friend of René Descartes. Beeckman had met the young Descartes in November 1618 in Breda, where Beeckman then lived and Descartes was then garrisoned as a soldier. It is said that they met when both were looking at a placard that was set up in the Breda marketplace, detailing a mathematical problem to be solved. Descartes asked Beeckman to translate the problem from Dutch to French. In their following meetings Beeckman interested Descartes in his corpuscularian approach to mechanics, and convinced him to devote his studies to a mathematical approach to nature. In 1619, Descartes dedicated one of his first tractati to him, the Compendium Musicae. When Descartes returned to the Dutch Republic in the autumn of 1628, Beeckman also introduced him to many of Galileo's ideas. In 1629 they fell out over a dispute concerning whether Beeckman had helped Descartes with some of his mathematical discoveries. In October 1630, Descartes wrote a long and harshly abusive letter, apparently meant to crush Beeckman psychologically, in which he declared himself never to have been influenced by Beeckman. However, and despite a few other such fallings-out, they remained in contact until Beeckman's death in 1637.

== Work and legacy ==
Beeckman did not publish his ideas, but he had influenced many scientists of his time. Since the beginning of his studies he did keep an extensive journal ("Journaal" in Dutch), from which his brother published posthumous some of his observations in 1644 the treatise Mathematico-physicarum meditationum, quaestionum, solutionum centuria. However, this went basically unnoticed.

The scope of Beeckman's ideas did not come to light until the science historian Cornelis de Waard rediscovered the Journaal in 1905, and published it in volumes between 1939 and 1953.

- Rejecting Aristotle, Beeckman developed, independent of Sebastian Basso, the concept that matter is composed of atoms.
- Beeckman is mentioned to be one of the first persons describing inertia correctly, however he also assumes that a constant circular velocity is conserved.

Vibrating string in fundamental mode, with three different lengths

- Beeckman had shown that the fundamental frequency of a vibrating string is proportional to the reciprocal of the length of the string.
- In the analysis of the functioning of a pump he theorized correctly that air pressure is the cause and not the then popular theory of horror vacui.

In his time, he was considered to be one of the most educated men in Europe. For example, he had deeply impressed Mersenne, despite their opposing religious views, as well as Pierre Gassendi, who apparently had been turned by Beeckman to the philosophy of Epicurus (atomism). Gassendi even proclaimed, in a 1629 letter to Peiresc, that Beeckman was the greatest philosopher he had ever met.

== See also ==
- Isaac Newton

== Bibliography ==
- van Berkel, Klaas (1983). Isaac Beeckman en de mechanisering van het wereldbeeld (in Dutch). Amsterdam: Rodopi. ISBN 9062039146.
- van Berkel, Klaas (2013). Isaac Beeckman on Matter and Motion: Mechanical Philosophy in the Making. Translated by Maarten Ultree. Philadelphia: Johns Hopkins University Press. ISBN 978-1-4214-0961-0.
