= Adriaan Metius =

Dutch geometer and astronomer

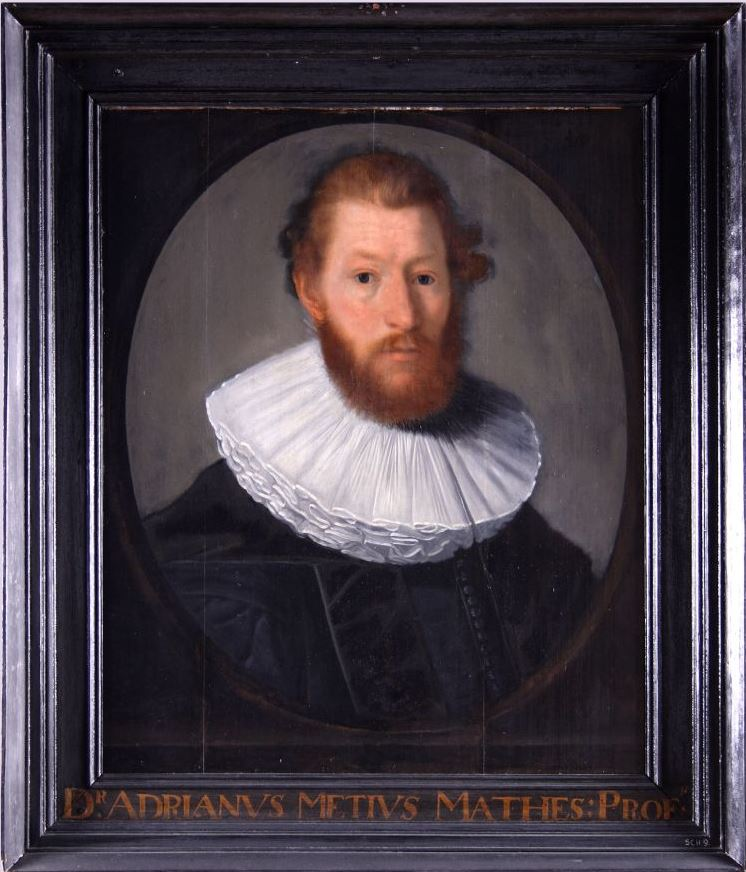
- Born: Adriaan Adriaanszoon; 9 December 1571; Alkmaar
- Died: 6 September 1635 (aged 63); Franeker
- Education: University of Franeker; University of Leiden
- Scientific career
- Fields: Geometry; Astronomy
- Workplaces: University of Franeker
- Academic advisors: Tycho Brahe; Rudolph Snellius
- Notable students: René Descartes

Adriaan Adriaanszoon, called Adriaan Metius (9 December 1571 – 6 September 1635), was a Dutch geometer and astronomer, born in Alkmaar. The name "Metius" comes from the Dutch word meten ("measuring"), and therefore means something like "measurer" or "surveyor".

== Father and brother ==
Adriaan Metius was born in Alkmaar, North Holland. His father, Adriaan Anthonisz, was a mathematician, land-surveyor, cartographer, and military engineer who from 1582 served also as burgomaster of Alkmaar.

Metius's brother, Jacob Metius, worked as an instrument-maker and a specialist in grinding lenses. Also born in Alkmaar, Jacob died between 1624 and 1631. Little is known of him besides the fact that, in October 1608, the States General discussed his patent application for an optical telescope of his own invention described as a device for "seeing faraway things as though nearby", consisting of a convex and concave lens in a tube, and the combination magnified three or four times.

== Education ==
Adriaan Metius attended a Latin school in Alkmaar and studied philosophy in 1589 at the recently founded University of Franeker. He continued his studies at the University of Leiden in 1594, where he studied under Rudolph Snellius. He worked for a brief time under Tycho Brahe on the island of Hven, where Brahe had built two observatories, and subsequently worked at Rostock and Jena, where he gave lectures in 1595. Subsequently, he returned to Alkmaar and assisted his father for a time as a military engineer inspecting fortifications, and also worked as a teacher of mathematics at Franeker in Frisia, his teaching especially geared towards the training of surveyors.

At the University of Franeker, he was appointed professor extraordinarius in 1598, and served from 1600 to 1635 as professor ordinarius of mathematics, navigation, surveying, military engineering, and astronomy. He was permitted to teach in the vernacular instead of Latin. He served as rector of the university in 1603 and 1632.

With his father and brother he established an instrument making business which specialised in optical instruments. The family business seems to have manufactured the precision Jacob's staffs used by Tycho Brahe for his star sightings.

He died in Franeker.

== Accomplishments ==
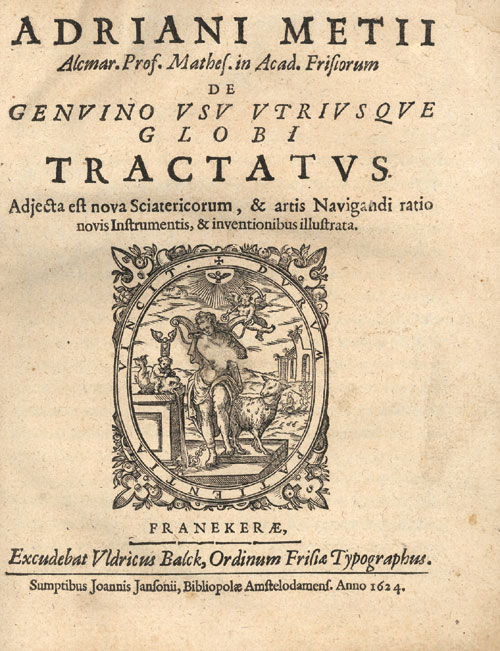
Adriaen Metius: De genuino usu utriusqve globi tractatus. Adjecta est nova Sciatericorum, & artis Navigandi ratio novis Instrumentis, & inventionibus illustrata. Franeker, 1624.

Though he scoffed at astrology, Metius is said to have spent a lot of time pursuing alchemy, especially the philosophers' stone.

Metius published treatises on the astrolabe and on surveying. His works include Arithmeticæ et geometriæ practica (1611), Institutiones Astronomicae Geographicae, and Arithmeticæ libri duo: et geometriæ libri VI (1640). Metius also manufactured astronomical instruments and developed a special form of Jacob's staff.

In 1585, his father had estimated the ratio of a circle's circumference to its diameter, later called pi, to be approximately 355/113. Metius later published his father's results, and the value 355/113 is traditionally referred to as Metius's number.

The lunar crater Metius is named after him.

In Vermeer's painting The Astronomer (1668), the book lying on the table has been identified as a 1621 second edition of Metius's Institutiones Astronomicae Geographicae. It is opened to Book III, where "inspiration from God" is recommended for astronomical research along with knowledge of geometry and the aid of mechanical instruments.
