= Boston Micromachines Corporation =

- Industry: Deformable mirror Adaptive Optics; MEMS
- Founded: Boston, Massachusetts, U.S. (1999)
- Founder: Dr. Thomas Bifano; Paul Bierden
- Headquarters: Cambridge, Massachusetts
- Area served: Worldwide
- Products: Customized adaptive optics enabled MEMS products including deformable mirrors, optical modulators, retro-reflectors, and ophthalmoscopes
- Website: BostonMicromachines.com

Boston Micromachines Corporation is a US company operating out of Cambridge, Massachusetts. Boston Micromachines manufactures and develops instruments based on MEMS technology to perform open and closed-loop adaptive optics. The technology is applied in astronomy, beam shaping, vision science, retinal imaging, microscopy, laser communications, and national defense. The instruments developed at Boston Micromachines include deformable mirrors, optical modulators, and retinal imaging systems, all of which utilize adaptive optics technology to enable wavefront manipulation capabilities which enhance the quality of the final image.

== History ==
Founded in 1999 by Dr. Thomas Bifano and Paul Bierden, Boston Micromachines is a provider of MEMS-based mirror products for use in commercial adaptive optics systems which apply wavefront correction to produce high resolution images of the human retina and enhance blurred images. The company also performs contract research in optical MEMS fabrication.

== Research and development ==
Boston Micromachines is funded in part by research programs and develops new products for astronomy, microscopy, pulse shaping, beam shaping, fiber coupling, space optics, retinal imaging, and national defense purposes.

Most recently, Boston Micromachines has developed an Adaptive Optics Scanning Laser Ophthalmoscope for high-resolution in vivo imaging in the human retina for use in pre-clinical studies. The instrument is currently in use in the Feinberg School of Medicine and the Joslin Diabetes Center. Capabilities include quantitative measures of cone physiology, detection of microaneurysms and small vessel blood flow profiling.

Their products are often customized for specific applications.

== Applications ==
=== Astronomy ===
Boston Micromachines develops deformable mirrors for telescopes to correct for atmospheric disturbance. Projects currently using Boston Micromachines' mirror technology include the ViLLaGEs Project at the Lick Observatory as well as the Gemini Planet Imager in Chile.

=== Biological imaging ===
Through the use of adaptive optics, deformable mirrors can be used to enhance Confocal techniques such as two-photon excitation fluorescence (2PEF), second- and/or third-Harmonic Generation (SHG/THG, respectively), Coherent anti-Stokes Raman spectroscopy (CARS), Scanning laser ophthalmoscopy (SLO), Optical coherence tomography (OCT) as well as conventional wide-field microscopy. Of particular interest is that deformable mirrors increase the resolution of retinal images to achieve ~2 μm resolution levels. Photoreceptor cells are around 3 μm in diameter. Without adaptive optics, resolution levels are in the 10-15 μm range. Research using other confocal techniques is currently taking place at such locations as the University of Durham, Harvard University and Boston University.

=== Laser beam and pulse shaping ===
Boston Micromachines deformable mirrors are capable of correcting for atmospheric distortion in long distance laser communication and other pulse shaping applications.

== Management ==
- Paul Bierden, President and CEO
- Dr. Thomas Bifano, Chief Technology Officer
- Steve Cornelissen, Vice President of Engineering

== Awards ==
- 2010 R&D 100 Awards, Bioscience for MEMS-based Adaptive Optics Optical Coherence Tomography Instrument
- 2009 Dr. Thomas Bifano Awarded Bepi Colombo Prize
- 2007 Micro/Nano 25 Awards, Innovation
- 2003 R&D 100 Award, MEMS Based Adaptive Optics Phoropter

== See also ==
- Adaptive optics
- Deformable mirror
- The era of adaptive optics
- Modulation
- Microelectromechanical systems
- Optical modulator
- Retroreflector
- Scanning laser ophthalmoscopy
- Wavefront sensor
