= GJ 3305 =

Star system in the constellation Eridanus

- Location of GJ 3305 (circled in red)

Observation data Epoch J2000 Equinox ICRS
- Constellation: Eridanus
- Right ascension: 04^{h} 37^{m} 37.4553^{s}
- Declination: −02° 29′ 28.951″
- Apparent magnitude (V): +10.59

Characteristics
- Evolutionary stage: main sequence
- Spectral type: M1.1V

Astrometry
Radial velocity (R_{v})	+20.03+0.10 −0.09 km/s
Proper motion (μ)	RA: +54 mas/yr Dec.: –47 mas/yr
Parallax (π)	36.0085±0.4758 mas
Distance	91 ± 1 ly (27.8 ± 0.4 pc)

Orbit
Period (P)	29.39+0.53 −0.44 yr
Semi-major axis (a)	0.335+0.004 −0.003" (9.30+0.24 −0.21 au)
Eccentricity (e)	0.19±0.01
Inclination (i)	92.17+0.10 −0.12°
Longitude of the node (Ω)	18.88±0.10°
Periastron epoch (T)	2036.67±0.14
Argument of periastron (ω) (secondary)	−66.2+2.5 −2.3°
Semi-amplitude (K_{1}) (primary)	4.01±0.38 km/s

Details

GJ 3305 A
Mass	0.52±0.02 M_{☉}
Luminosity	0.112±0.007 L_{☉}
Surface gravity (log g)	4.5 cgs
Temperature	3,500 K
Age	20–30 Myr

GJ 3305 B
Mass	0.44±0.05 M_{☉}
Luminosity	0.043±0.005 L_{☉}
Surface gravity (log g)	4.5 cgs
Temperature	3,500 K
Age	20–30 Myr

Other designations
- GJ 3305, WDS J04376-0228C, 2MASS J04373746-0229282

Database references
SIMBAD	data

GJ 3305 is a binary star system in the constellation of Eridanus, notable for being bound to 51 Eridani, an exoplanet-hosting F-type main-sequence star. Based on parallax measurements, it is located at a distance of 91 light-years (28 parsecs).

== Characteristics ==
The two components of GJ 3305 are red dwarfs with a combined spectral type of M1.1V. They orbit around each other with a period of 29.4 years, following a slightly eccentric orbit with e = 0.19 and a semi-major axis of 9.3 au. The orbit is seen nearly edge-on, with an inclination of 92.1°. The primary, GJ 3305 A, has a mass of 0.52±0.02 M_{☉}, while the secondary, GJ 3305 B, has a mass of 0.44±0.05 M_{☉}. Both components are young, estimated to be between 20 and 30 million years old.

GJ 3305 was first noted as a physical companion to 51 Eridani in 2006. The two systems are separated by 66", yielding a projected separation of ~2,000 au.

== See also ==
- 51 Eridani b
