= 51 Eridani =

F-type main sequence star in the constellation Eridanus

- Location of 51 Eridani (circled in red)

Observation data Epoch J2000 Equinox ICRS
- Constellation: Eridanus
- Right ascension: 04^{h} 37^{m} 36.1326^{s}
- Declination: −02° 28′ 24.776″
- Apparent magnitude (V): 5.22

Characteristics
- Evolutionary stage: main sequence
- Spectral type: F0 V
- Variable type: γ Dor

Astrometry
Radial velocity (R_{v})	+12.6±0.3 km/s
Proper motion (μ)	RA: +44.049 mas/yr Dec.: –64.028 mas/yr
Parallax (π)	33.4390±0.0777 mas
Distance	97.5 ± 0.2 ly (29.91 ± 0.07 pc)
Absolute magnitude (M_{V})	+2.87

Details
Mass	1.550+0.006 −0.005 M_{☉}
Radius	1.45±0.02 R_{☉}
Luminosity	5.72±0.096 L_{☉}
Surface gravity (log g)	3.95±0.04 cgs
Temperature	7,422±58 K
Metallicity [Fe/H]	−0.12±0.06 dex
Rotational velocity (v sin i)	77.9 km/s
Age	23.2+1.7 −2.0 Myr

Other designations
- c Eridani, 51 Eridani, BD−02°963, HD 29391, HIP 21547, HR 1474, SAO 131358, 2MASS J04373613-0228248

Database references
SIMBAD	data
Exoplanet Archive	data

51 Eridani is a star in the constellation Eridanus. It has an apparent magnitude of 5.22, meaning it is just visible to the unaided eye in suburban and rural skies. The primary star's absolute magnitude is 2.87. There is also a binary star named GJ 3305 which shares the same proper motion through space with it, making it overall a triple star system.

The primary star is significant as the host to one of the first planets to have been directly imaged in a wide orbit, and the first detected by the Gemini Planet Imager.

== General information ==
Johann Bayer gave the star its Bayer designation of c Eridani, using lowercase letters once he had exhausted all the letters of the Greek alphabet, in his 1603 star chart Uranometria. It was catalogued as 51 Eridani by John Flamsteed in 1725.

Located around 97 light-years distant, it shines with a luminosity approximately 5.72 times that of the Sun and has a surface temperature of 7,400 K. A cold debris disk has been detected with a likely inner border of 82 astronomical units (AU). A yellow-white main-sequence star of spectral type F0V, 51 Eridani is a member of the Beta Pictoris moving group and hence thought to be around 23 million years old. Somewhat more luminous than it should be for its surface temperature, 51 Eridani has also been classified as spectral type F0IV—a type corresponding to ageing stars that have used up their core hydrogen fuel and become subgiants; however, in this case it is a phenomenon of very young stars 5 to 30 million years old that have yet to settle on the main sequence.

Photometric measurements with the TESS space telescope show that this is a Gamma Doradus-like pulsating star. Nine pulsation frequencies have been detected.

=== GJ 3305 ===
51 Eridani has two companions within the GJ 3305 system. The two stars are separated by 66″ from 51 Eridani, corresponding to a projected separation of 2,000 AU, and share common proper motion, hence being considered to be gravitationally bound. It is a binary star system with two M-type red dwarfs. The primary has a mass of 0.67±0.05 M_{☉}, while the secondary has a mass of 0.44±0.05 M_{☉}. The two red dwarfs themselves are separated by a semimajor axis of 9.78±0.14 AU and have an eccentricity of 0.19±0.02.

== Planetary system ==
51 Eridani and its planet 51 Eridani b

51 Eridani b is a young Jupiter-like planet and was photographed, in near-infrared light, on 21 December 2014. The study, led by Bruce Macintosh, a professor of physics at Stanford University and confirmed by Christian Marois found that methane and water were abundant in the atmosphere of the planet and its diameter was only slightly larger than Jupiter's. It was assumed to be the least massive exoplanet directly imaged when discovered. The planetary orbit was found to be significantly eccentric by 2019.

Gaia astrometry also suggests an additional planet on orbit smaller than 51 Eridani b.

The 51 Eridani planetary system
Companion (in order from star)	Mass	Semimajor axis (AU)	Orbital period (years)	Eccentricity	Inclination (°)	Radius
b	3.13+0.05 −0.04 M_{J}. M_{J}	9.08+0.57 −0.19	23.5+1.7 −0.9	0.55+0.03 −0.07	159.24+5.74 −11.48	1.36+0.07 −0.03 R_{J}
