= ALPAO =

ALPAO SAS
- Industry: Deformable mirror Adaptive Optics
- Founded: Grenoble, France (2006)
- Headquarters: Montbonnot, France
- Area served: worldwide
- Products: Deformable mirror and adaptive optics systems
- Revenue: 4-6 M€
- Number of employees: 20-50
- Website: www.alpao.com

ALPAO is a company which manufactures a range of adaptive optics products for use in research and industry, including deformable mirrors with large strokes, wavefront sensors, and adaptive optics loops. These products are designed for astronomy, vision science, microscopy, wireless optical communications, and laser applications.

== History ==
ALPAO developed from groundwork at the Université Joseph Fourier (Grenoble) and Floralis. In 2006 and 2008 ALPAO received awards for innovative technology from the French Ministry of Research. Other ALPAO partners include the Institut de Planétologie et d'Astrophysique de Grenoble, OSEO, ANR, Région Rhône-Alpes, Grenoble Alpes Incubation, the Reseau Entreprendre and Business France.

- 2017 ALPAO signs major contracts to supply Observatoire de Paris with a state-of-the-art high order DM, Physical Sciences Inc. with DM's for retinal imagers, ESO's Very Large Telescope Interferometer array for adaptive optics upgrade of the auxiliary telescopes. ALPAO extends its range of deformable mirrors and adaptive optics systems.
- 2016 ALPAO signs 2 major contracts with ESO to develop new deformable mirrors for next generation instruments and an agreement with Georgia State University for adaptive optics upgrade on telescopes at CHARA array.
- 2015 ALPAO released the DM468 and the DM820.
- 2013 ALPAO released the DM97-08 dedicated to vision science application.
- 2012 ALPAO join EVEON group.
- 2009 ALPAO introduces a new drive electronics increasing the performances of magnetic deformable mirrors.
- 2008 ALPAO introduces a new patented technology for deformable mirrors with increased strokes and improved optimal temporal response.
- 2007 ALPAO introduces its own wavefront sensor for closed loop operations
- 2006 ALPAO introduces a low speed deformable mirror.

== Applications ==
ALPAO’s deformable mirrors can be used in the following disciplines for image enhancement:

=== Vision science ===
Diagnosing illnesses of the eye may require high resolution images of the retina. Images taken using conventional instruments may be too poor in quality due to aberrations introduced by the eye itself. Adaptive optics offers a technique for restoring the image quality. In addition, adaptive optics may be used to create a vision simulator.

=== Astronomy ===
Turbulence introduced by the atmosphere degrades images taken using telescopes. Using adaptive optics recovers much of the information that is lost. As a result, it is possible to increase the number of scientific observations.

=== Microscopy ===
AO systems can correct for the sample aberration but also for the microscope and spherical aberration introduced by index mismatch. If not corrected, these aberrations reduce the resolution of the microscope.

=== Defense and Space ===
Turbulence introduced by the atmosphere degrades performances of numerous applications like: satellite imaging, advanced imaging systems, Free Space Optical communication and laser weapon. Deformable mirror technology enables an optimal compensation of this effect.

=== Laser and Physics ===
Laser beam shaping is showing a high increase of performance in numerous applications in physics like:

- Atomic trapping
- Light matter interaction at the atomic level for fundamental physics
- Microelectronics mask correction
- Laser cutting
- Quantum computing
- Free form metrology

== Management ==
- Vincent Templeare, President and CEO
- Piero Bruno, Sales & Marketing Director
- Julien Charton, CSO and cofounder

== See also ==
- Wavefront sensor
- Adaptive optics
- The era of adaptive optics
- Microelectromechanical systems
- Deformable mirror
