= Ferrofluid mirror =

Type of deformable mirror

A ferrofluid mirror is a type of deformable mirror with a reflective liquid surface, commonly used in adaptive optics. It is made of ferrofluid and magnetic iron particles in ethylene glycol, the basis of automotive antifreeze. The ferrofluid mirror changes shape instantly when a magnetic field is applied. As the ferromagnetic particles align with the magnetic field, the liquid becomes magnetized and its surface acquires a shape governed by the equilibrium between the magnetic, gravitational and surface tension forces. Since any shapes can be produced by changing the magnetic field geometries, wavefront control and correction can be achieved.

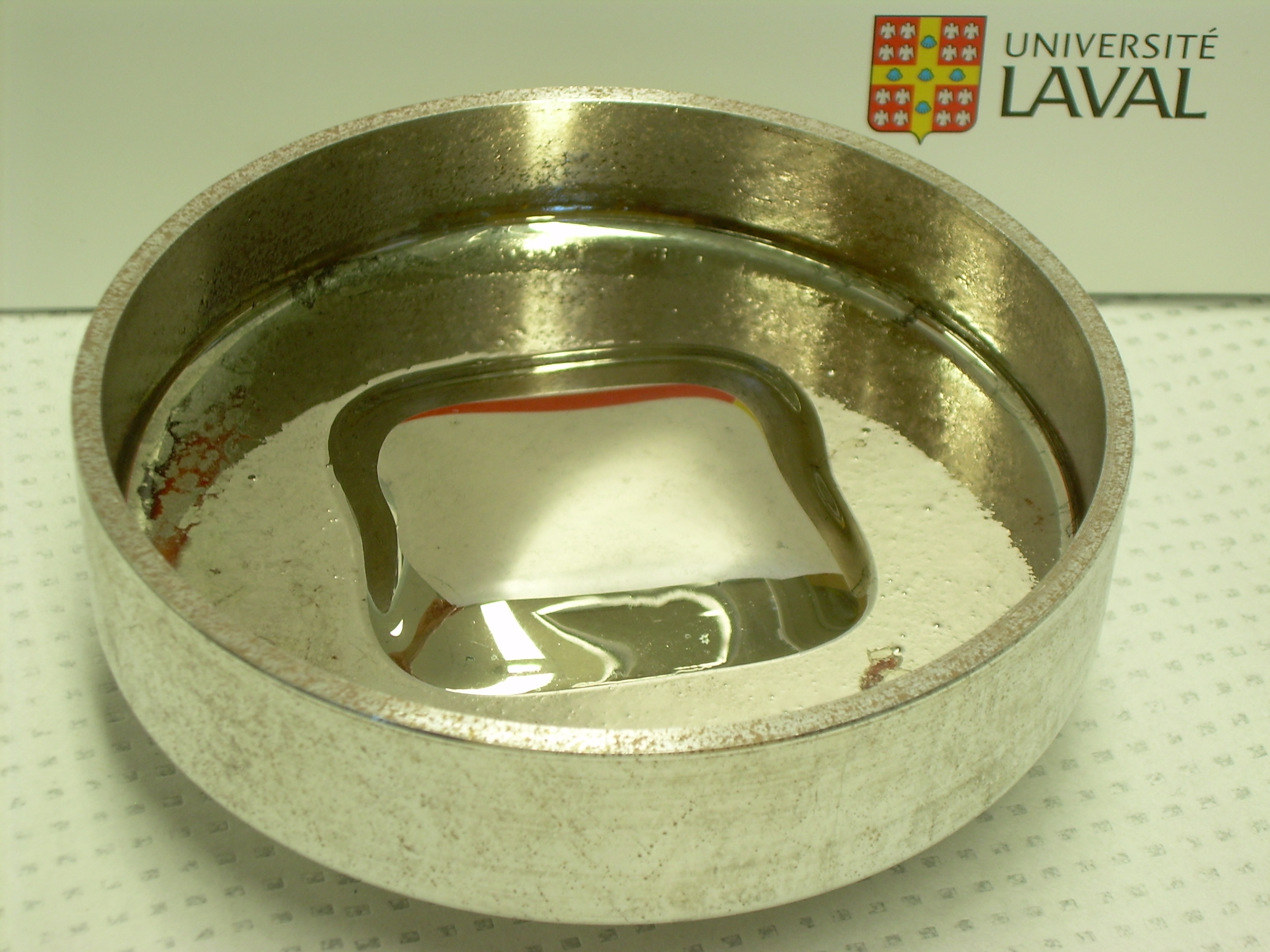
Ferrofluid deformable mirror

A ferrofluid mirror is controlled by a number of actuators, often arranged in a hexagonal array. Pure ferrofluids have low reflectivity, so they must be coated with a reflective layer. Water-based ferrofluids hold the reflective layer effectively, but water evaporates so quickly that the mirror could disappear within hours. Depositing a thin silver colloid known as a metal liquid-like film (MELLF) on the ferrofluid surface solves the problem of fast evaporation and low reflectivity of pure ferrofluids. The combination of fluid and metal results in a liquid optical surface that can be precisely shaped in a magnetic field.

== Applications ==
=== Astronomy ===
Ferrofluid mirror telescopes have been built to obtain astronomical data and used to take images of deep space; subjects for research include exoplanets. The main challenge astronomers and scientists face is image distortions due to wavefront errors caused by the atmosphere. The solution to this problem is to create mirrors with controllable surface shapes, known as deformable mirrors. Ferrofluid mirrors are used as deformable mirrors because when ferrofluids are exposed to a magnetic field, the liquid forms a shape to minimize the energy of the system which involves magnetic, gravitational, and surface tension forces of the liquid.

=== Ophthalmology ===
While ferrofluid mirrors are widely used in telescopes, ferrofluid mirrors might also be applied in the field of visual science. Human eyes suffer from many optical imperfections. Ophthalmologists look into the eyes to detect and diagnose diseases by examining the retina. Ferrofluid mirrors could be rapidly adjusted to compensate for the large distortions in diseased eyes during eye exams or treatments. They can generate surfaces having complex shapes, and thus can be used to determine the shape of the lens of the human eye, the crystalline lens. This may allow the measurement of high-order aberrations of the crystalline lens so that they can be corrected with appropriate medical procedures. The magnetically shaped reference surface would further be used to verify the correction made to the lens of the eye before, during or after the procedures.

== Developments ==
=== Deformable solid mirror ===
Before ferrofluid mirrors were invented, solid deformable mirrors were used to correct atmospheric distortion and keep a steady focus. Deformable solid mirrors use flexible mirrors with complex actuators underneath to correct for atmospheric distortion and keep a steady focus. Shortcomings of traditional deformable solid mirrors include cost, fragility, and the need for continuous power. Images from these mirrors have an undesirable quilt pattern due to the discrete actuators beneath the mirror surface.

=== Mercury mirror ===
Mercury was used as the main material of early deformable liquid-mirror telescopes because of its high reflectivity and low melting temperature. However, as a magnetic liquid, it had problems. It is difficult to obtain a stable metallic based magnetic liquid, and the high density of mercury necessitates a larger deforming force and thus a strong magnetic field.

=== Ferrofluid mirror ===
The limitations associated with the use of mercury for deformable liquid mirrors can be solved through the use of ferrofluids. Ferrofluid mirrors use cheaper materials, and are able to make more corrections due to its larger range of motion. Stable ferrofluids have wide ranges of physical properties thus can be produced to suit many practical application needs.
