= Active optics =

Shaping technology for reflecting telescopes

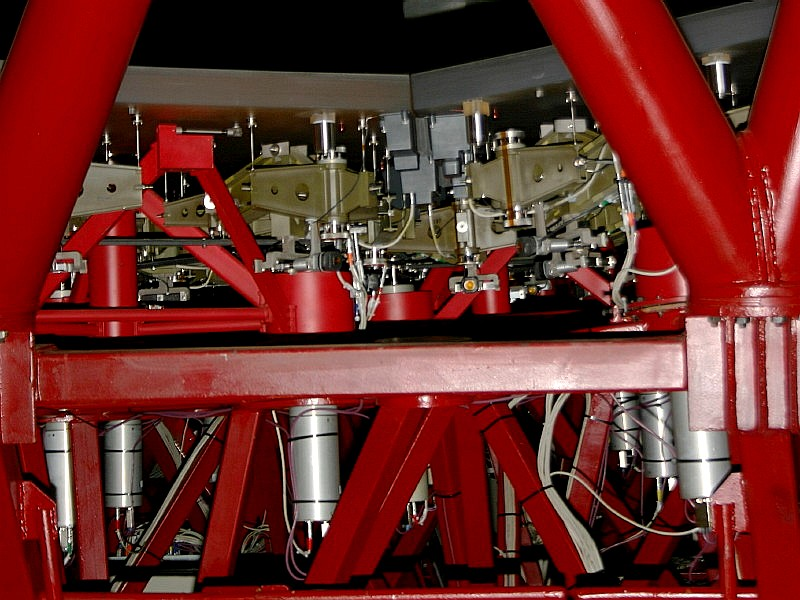
Actuators of the active optics of the Gran Telescopio Canarias.

Active optics is a technology used with reflecting telescopes developed in the 1980s, which actively shapes a telescope's mirrors to prevent deformation due to external influences such as wind, temperature, and mechanical stress. Without active optics, the construction of 8 metre class telescopes is not possible, nor would telescopes with segmented mirrors be feasible.

This method is used by, among others, the Nordic Optical Telescope, the New Technology Telescope, the Telescopio Nazionale Galileo and the Keck telescopes, as well as all of the largest telescopes built since the mid-1990s.

Active optics is not to be confused with adaptive optics, which operates at a shorter timescale and corrects atmospheric distortions.

== In astronomy ==
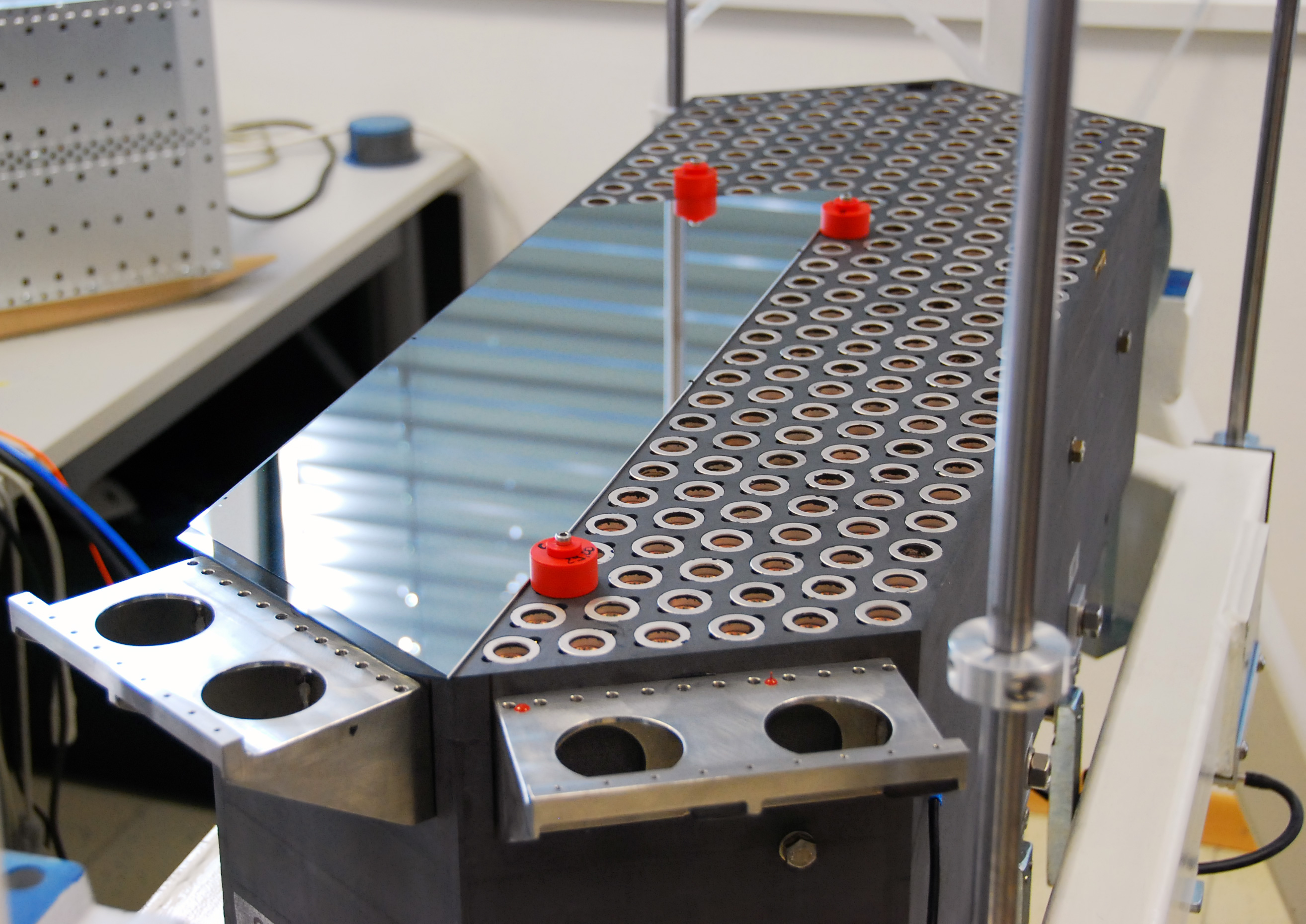
Prototype of part of the adaptive support system of the E-ELT.

Most modern telescopes are reflectors, with the primary element being a very large mirror. Historically, primary mirrors were quite thick in order to maintain the correct surface figure in spite of forces tending to deform it, like wind and the mirror's own weight. This limited their maximum diameter to 5 or 6 metres (200 or 230 inches), such as Palomar Observatory's Hale Telescope.

A new generation of telescopes built since the 1980s uses thin, lighter weight mirrors instead. They are too thin to maintain themselves rigidly in the correct shape, so an array of actuators is attached to the rear side of the mirror. The actuators apply variable forces to the mirror body to keep the reflecting surface in the correct shape over repositioning. The telescope may also be segmented into multiple smaller mirrors, which reduce the sagging due to weight that occurs for large, monolithic mirrors.

The combination of actuators, an image quality detector, and a computer to control the actuators to obtain the best possible image, is called active optics.

The name active optics means that the system keeps a mirror (usually the primary) in its optimal shape against environmental forces such as wind, sag, thermal expansion, and telescope axis deformation. Active optics compensates for distorting forces that change relatively slowly, roughly on timescales of seconds. The telescope is therefore actively active, in its optimal shape.

=== Comparison with adaptive optics ===
Active optics should not be confused with adaptive optics, which operates on a much shorter timescale to compensate for atmospheric effects, rather than for mirror deformation. The influences that active optics compensate (temperature, gravity) are intrinsically slower (1 Hz) and have a larger amplitude in aberration. Adaptive optics on the other hand corrects for atmospheric distortions that affect the image at 100–1000 Hz (the Greenwood frequency, depending on wavelength and weather conditions). These corrections need to be much faster, but also have smaller amplitude. Because of this, adaptive optics uses smaller corrective mirrors. This used to be a separate mirror not integrated in the telescope's light path, but nowadays this can be the second, third or fourth mirror in a telescope.

== Other applications ==
Complicated laser set-ups and interferometers can also be actively stabilized.

A small part of the beam leaks through beam steering mirrors and a four-quadrant-diode is used to measure the position of a laser beam and another in the focal plane behind a lens is used to measure the direction. The system can be sped up or made more noise-immune by using a PID controller. For pulsed lasers the controller should be locked to the repetition rate. A continuous (non-pulsed) pilot beam can be used to allow for up to 10 kHz bandwidth of stabilization (against vibrations, air turbulence, and acoustic noise) for low repetition rate lasers.

Sometimes Fabry–Pérot interferometers have to be adjusted in length to pass a given wavelength. Therefore, the reflected light is extracted by means of a Faraday rotator and a polarizer. Small changes of the incident wavelength generated by an acousto-optic modulator or interference with a fraction of the incoming radiation delivers the information whether the Fabry Perot is too long or too short.

Long optical cavities are very sensitive to the mirror alignment. A control circuit can be used to peak power. One possibility is to perform small rotations with one end mirror. If this rotation is about the optimum position, no power oscillation occurs. Any beam pointing oscillation can be removed using the beam steering mechanism mentioned above.

X-ray active optics, using actively deformable grazing incidence mirrors, are also being investigated.

== See also ==
- Adaptive optics – faster technology for smaller aberrations.
- Telescope
- Active surface – similar technology for radio telescopes.
- List of telescope parts and construction
