= Gemini Planet Imager =

Imaging instrument for the Gemini South Telescope in Chile

The Gemini Planet Imager (GPI) is a high contrast imaging instrument that was built for the Gemini South Telescope in Chile. The instrument achieves high contrast at small angular separations, allowing for the direct imaging and integral field spectroscopy of extrasolar planets around nearby stars. The collaboration involved in planning and building the Gemini Planet imager includes the American Museum of Natural History (AMNH), Dunlap Institute, Gemini Observatory, Herzberg Institute of Astrophysics (HIA), Jet Propulsion Laboratory, Lawrence Livermore National Lab (LLNL), Lowell Observatory, SETI Institute, The Space Telescope Science Institute (STSCI), the University of Montreal, University of California, Berkeley, University of California, Los Angeles (UCLA), University of California, Santa Cruz (UCSC), University of Georgia.

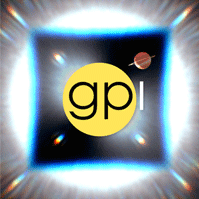

== Specifications ==
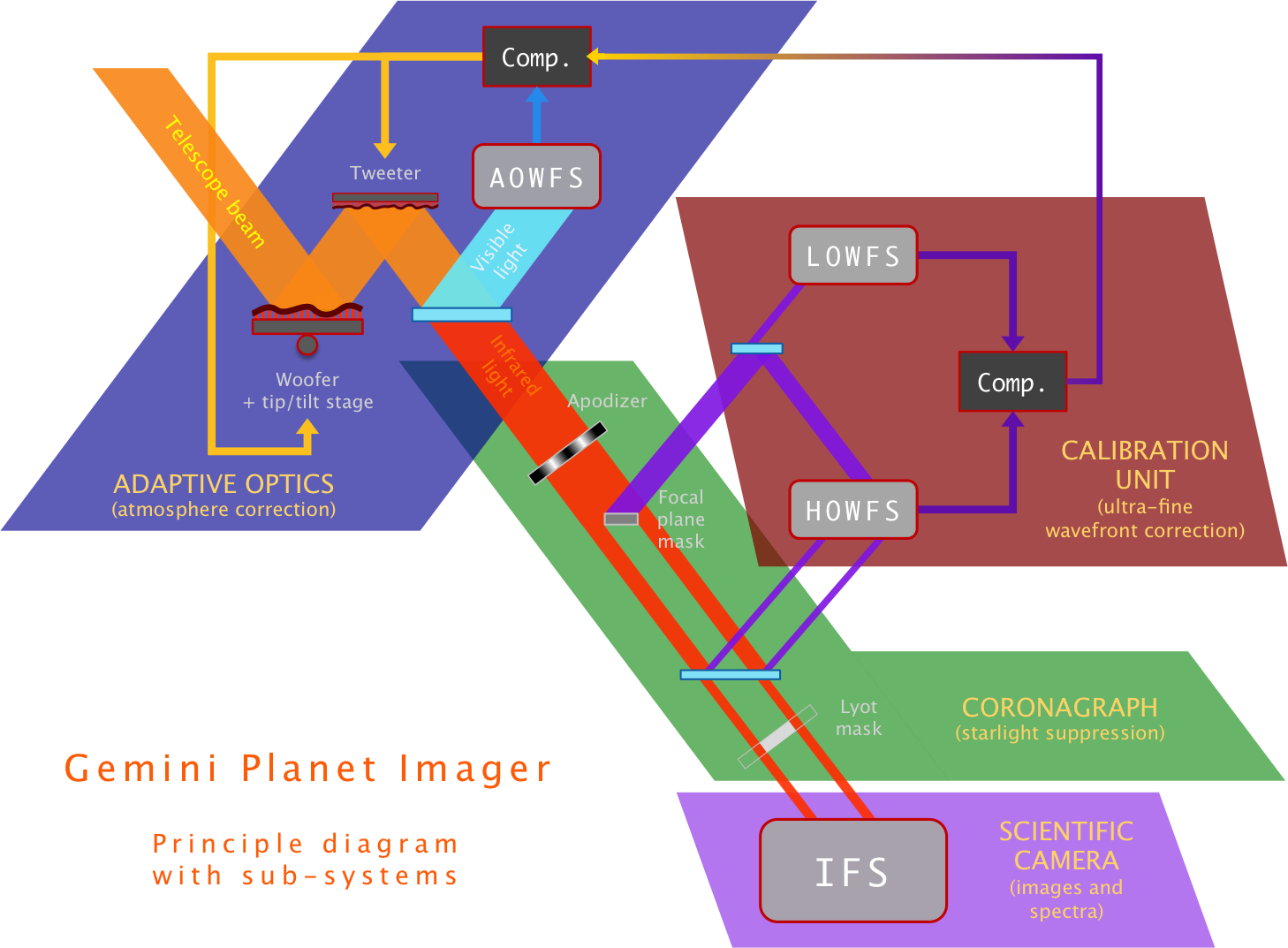
GPI sub-systems diagram.

The Gemini Planet Imager is being used at the Gemini South Telescope, located in Cerro Pachon, Chile. It saw first light in November 2013, and entered regular operations in November 2014. It is designed to directly detect young gas giants via their thermal emission. It will operate at near-infrared wavelengths (Y - K bands), where planets will be reasonably bright, but thermal emission from the Earth's atmosphere is not too strong.

The system consists of multiple components, including a high-order adaptive optics system, a coronagraph, a calibration interferometer, and an integral field spectrograph. The adaptive optics system, being built at LLNL, uses a MEMS deformable mirror from Boston Micromachines Corporation to correct wavefront errors induced by motion of air in the atmosphere and the optics in the telescope. The coronagraph, being built at AMNH, blocks out the light from the star being observed, which is necessary in order to see a much dimmer companion. Before sending the GPI at Gemini South it was essential to test the coronagraph by reproducing the exact experimental conditions in which it was going to be used. A Photon etc. tunable laser source was used for this and helped determine that, at its most efficient wavelength, the imager could detect a planet only slightly more massive than Jupiter around a 100-million-year-old Sun-like star. The spectrograph, developed by UCLA and Montreal, images and takes spectra of any detected companion to the star, with a spectral resolving power of 34 - 83, depending on wavelength. The expected instrument performance will allow for detection of companions one ten millionth as bright as their hosts at angular separations of roughly 0.2-1 arcseconds, down to an H band magnitude of 23.

== Scientific goals ==
Present day searches for exoplanets are insensitive to exoplanets located at the distances from their host star comparable to the semi-major axes of the gas giants in the Solar System, greater than about 5 AU. Surveys using the radial velocity method require observing a star over at least one period of revolution, which is roughly 30 years for a planet at the distance of Saturn. Existing adaptive optics instruments become ineffective at small angular separations, limiting them to semi-major axes larger than about 30 astronomical units. The high contrast of the Gemini Planet Imager at small angular separations will allow it to detect gas giants with semi-major axes of 5–30 astronomical units.

The Gemini Planet Imager will be most effective at detecting young gas giants, one million to one billion years old. The reason for this is that young planets retain heat from their formation, and only gradually cool. While a planet is still hot, it remains bright, and is thus more easily detected. This limits GPI to younger targets, but means that it will yield information about how gas giants form. In particular, the spectrograph will allow determination of the temperature and surface gravity, which yield information about the atmospheres and thermal evolution of gas giants.

In addition to its main goal of imaging exoplanets, GPI will be capable of studying protoplanetary disks, transition disks, and debris disks around young stars. This may provide clues about planet formation. The technique used to image disks with this instrument is called polarization differential imaging. Another science case is to study Solar System objects at high spatial resolution and high Strehl ratio. Asteroids and their moons, the satellites of Jupiter and Saturn, and the planets Uranus and Neptune are all good targets for GPI. The final ancillary science case is to study the mass loss from evolved stars via their outflow.

== Achievements ==
The planet 51 Eridani b is the first exoplanet discovered by the Gemini Planet Imager. It is a million times fainter than its parent star and shows the second strongest methane signature ever detected on an alien planet (after only GJ 504b), which should yield additional clues as to how the planet formed.

== Evolution ==
In 2022, GPI was removed from the Gemini South telescope and shipped to the University of Notre Dame in Indiana to undergo a major upgrade of the whole system called GPI 2.0. GPI 2.0 will be installed on the Gemini North telescope and is expected to see first light in 2027.

== Gallery ==
GPI Image of star HR4796a showing the debris disk as seen through polarization measurements.

== Bibliography ==
- Graham, James R.; Macintosh, Bruce; Doyon, Rene; Gavel, Don; Larkin, James; Levine, Marty; Oppenheimer, Rebecca; Palmer, David; Saddlemyer, Les; Sivaramakrishnan, Anand; Veran, Jean-Pierre; Wallace, Kent (2007). "Ground-Based Direct Detection of Exoplanets with the Gemini Planet Imager (GPI)". arXiv:0704.1454 [astro-ph].
- Bruce Macintosh; James Graham; David Palmer; Rene Doyon; Don Gavel; James Larkin; Ben Oppenheimer; Leslie Saddlemyer; J. Kent Wallace; Brian Bauman; Julia Evans; Darren Erikson; Katie Morzinski; Donald Phillion; Lisa Poyneer; Anand Sivaramakrishnan; Remi Soummer; Simon Thibault; Jean-Pierre Veran (June 2006). "The Gemini Planet Imager". Advances in Adaptive Optics II. Vol. 6272. pp. 62720L–62720L–12. Bibcode:2006SPIE.6272E..0LM. doi:10.1117/12.672430. OSTI 898473. S2CID 123044593.
