= Atmospheric correction =

Photographic image processing tecnhique

Atmospheric correction is the process of adjusting images taken by satellite or airborne sensors to remove distortions caused by the atmosphere. These distortions—mainly due to the scattering and absorption of sunlight by particles and gases—can affect how accurately the sensor captures the true reflectance (or brightness) of the Earth's surface.

In remote sensing, atmospheric effects can significantly alter the spectral characteristics of the radiation detected by sensors. This occurs because light must pass through the atmosphere twice—first as sunlight traveling to the Earth's surface, and again as reflected light returning to the sensor—undergoing both absorption and scattering along the way. These distortions can affect the accuracy of surface reflectance measurements and are typically corrected through a range of physical and statistical methods.

== Examples of atmospheric correction methods ==
Examples of atmospheric correction techniques for multispectral remote-sensing images, ordered chronologically to show the historical development of atmospheric correction methods in remote-sensing.
Sensor	Approach
MSS	band-to-band regression
MSS	all-band spectral covariance
airborne MSS	band-to-band regression
AVHRR	iterative estimation
MSS, TM	DOS with exponential scattering model
TM	DOS with exponential scattering model, downwelling atmospheric radiance measurements
TM	pixel-by-pixel tasseled cap haze parameter
AVHRR	DOS, NDVI, AVHRR band 3
airborne TMS, Landsat TM	ground and airborne solar measurements, atmospheric modeling code
TM	comparison of ten DOS and atmospheric modeling code variations with field data
TM	dark target, modeling code
TM (all bands)	atmospheric modeling code, region histogram matching
TM	DOS with estimated atmospheric transmittance
TM	dark target, atmospheric modeling code
TM, ETM+	empirical line method, single target, ground measurements
TM	water reservoirs, comparison of 7 methods for 12 dates
AVHRR	2-band PCT used to separate aerosol components

== See also ==
- Adaptive optics
