= Scanning laser ophthalmoscopy =

Method of eye examination

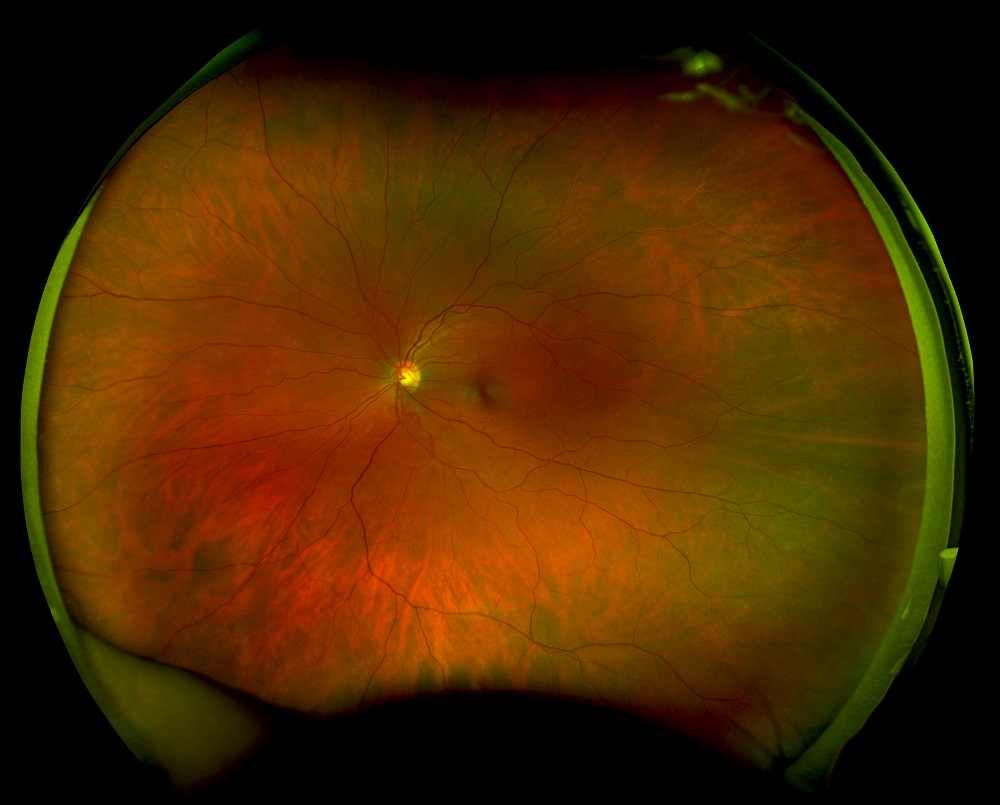
- Optomap image of a healthy adult retina
- Purpose: diagnostic imaging of retina(or cornea)

Scanning laser ophthalmoscopy (SLO) is a method of examination of the eye. It uses the technique of confocal laser scanning microscopy for diagnostic imaging of the retina or cornea of the human eye.

As a method used to image the retina with a high degree of spatial sensitivity, it is helpful in the diagnosis of glaucoma, macular degeneration, and other retinal disorders. It has further been combined with adaptive optics technology to provide sharper images of the retina.

== Scanning laser ophthalmoscopy ==
SLO utilizes horizontal and vertical scanning mirrors to scan a specific region of the retina and create raster images viewable on a television monitor. While it is able to image the retina in real time, it has issues with reflections from eye astigmatism and the cornea. Eye movements additionally can confound the data from SLO.

== Adaptive optics scanning laser ophthalmoscopy ==
Adaptive optics scanning laser ophthalmoscopy (AOSLO) is a technique used to measure living retinal cells. It utilizes adaptive optics to remove optical aberrations from images obtained from scanning laser ophthalmoscopy of the retina.

=== History ===
Scanning laser ophthalmoscopy developed as a method to view a distinct layer of the living eye at the microscopic level. The use of confocal methods to diminish extra light by focusing detected light through a small pinhole made possible the imaging of individual layers of the retina with greater distinction than ever before. However, using SLO for monitoring of individual retinal cells proved problematic because of optical aberrations created from the tissues of the anterior eye (specifically the cornea and lens). These aberrations (caused additionally by astigmatism and other factors affecting eye position) diminished lateral resolution and proved difficult to remove.

Adaptive optics was first attempted for SLO in the 1980s. This first attempt did not use wavefront-detecting technology with its deformable mirror and estimated aberrations through pre-measured factors such as astigmatism. However, this did not diffuse the small monochromatic aberrations resulting from light traveling through the anterior eye both into and out of the pupil during scanning. The invention and adaptation of the Shack–Hartmann wavefront sensor for the apparatus produced images of the retina with much higher lateral resolution. The addition of microelectricalmechanical (MEMs) mirrors instead of larger, more expensive mirror deformable mirror systems to the apparatus made AOSLO further usable for a wider range of studies and for use in patients.

=== Procedure ===
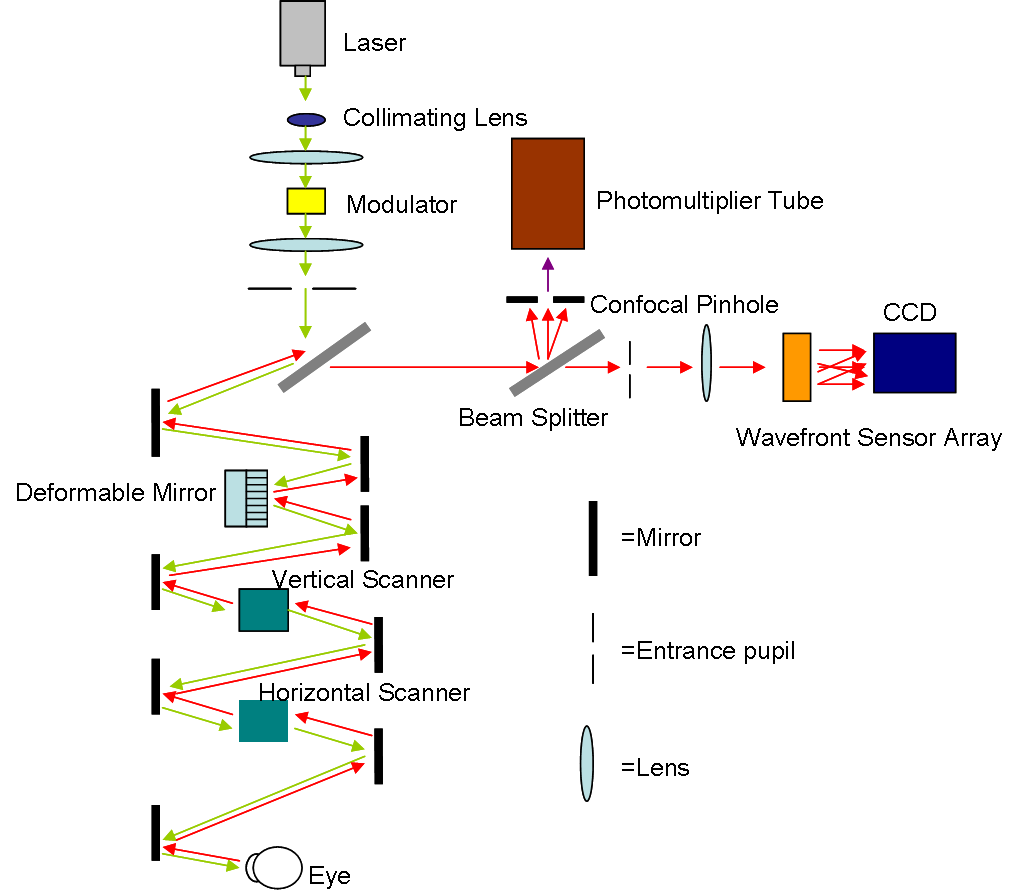
Diagram of the AOSLO setup

The subject is placed in a dental impression mount fixed in a way to make it possible to manipulate the head in three dimensions. The subject's pupils are dilated using a dilating agent to minimize fluctuations from accommodation. After the eyes are sufficiently dilated, the subject is told to fixate on a target while in the mount.

Once the subject is properly placed, wavefront correction and imaging takes place. A laser is collimated and then reflected off of a beam-splitting mirror. As in confocal SLO, light must pass through both a horizontal and a vertical scanning mirror before and after the eye is scanned to align the moving beam for eventual retinal faster images of the retina. Additionally, the light is reflected off of a deformable mirror before and after exposure to the eye to diffuse optical aberrations. The laser enters the eye through the pupil to illuminate the region it has been focused onto and light reflected back leaves the same way. Light returning from the mirrors passes through the first beam splitter onto another beam splitter where it is directed simultaneously toward a photomultiplier tube (PMT) and toward a Shack–Hartmann wavefront sensor array. The light going toward the photomultiplier is focused through a confocal microscopy pinhole to remove light not reflecting off of the plane of interest and then recorded in the PMT. Light directed to the wavefront sensor array is split up by the lenslets in the array and then recorded onto a charge-coupled device (CCD) camera for detection of optical aberrations. These aberrations are then subtracted from the images recorded in the PMT to vastly increase lateral resolution.

=== Applications ===
A major use of this increased lateral resolution from AOSLO has been the ability to determine the spatial distribution of cone cells around the fovea. Not only can the spatial density of these cells be found for a variety of regions within the retina, but the anisotropy of these cells can also be calculated to determine the axial orientation of retinal cells in the living subject. This represents a major benefit over typical histological examination of small numbers of donated human eyes. AOSLO has also revealed significant decreases in foveal cone packing density for myopic eyes in comparison to emmetriopic eyes. This difference has been hypothesized to originate from a natural decrease in cone density with the increase in eye axial length associated with myopia. Abnormalities in photoreceptor structure in regions damaged by macular dystrophy have additionally been imaged by AOSLO. In these subjects, a dark area has been visualized within the macular lesion and morphologically abnormal photoreceptors have been visible on the lesion perimeter. Furthermore, scanning of subjects with cone dystrophy and retinitis pigmentosa (RP) has shown significant changes in cone packing density for these subjects compared to those with normal retinas. This presents a possible future use of AOSLO in phenotype tracking and confirmation for subjects with diseased genotypes.

The imaging of retinal pigment epithelium (RPE) cells in patients with and without retinal disease has also proved possible with the use of AOSLO. With the loss of photoreceptor cells, background scattered light decreases and the light focused on the RPE can be analyzed more clearly. As the loss of RPE cells represents the primary pathology of macular degeneration, this provides a possible future avenue for tracking RPE degradation in vivo. This has been further proved with the analysis of lipofuscin granule autofluorescence in normal human and rhesus macaque retinas by AOSLO. Comparison of this fluorescence in normal and diseased retinas with simultaneous imaging of cone structure and cone/retinal pigment cell ratio analysis has been shown to be possible and in the future may allow for the tracking of retinal damage from retinal dystrophies. AOSLO has already been used in rhesus macaques to track light damage to the macula from particular wavelengths.

Additionally, AOSLO provides a greater degree of accuracy for eye tracking than possible before with other techniques. Because of the short scan time involved in AOSLO, eye motion itself represents an obstacle to taking images of the retina. Computational adjustments and modeling have been able to correct for aberrations caused by eye motion between frames. However, by tracking these aberrations based on changes to the retina between pictures, the effect of light on the individual orientation of the cone can be tracked. Research utilizing a visual stimulus and AOSLO eye tracking have yielded data on how the retina tracks movement at the microscopic level.

The high degree of specificity and the ability to focus the laser on different levels of the eyes with AOSLO has additionally allowed for real time tracking of blood flow in the eye. By injecting fluorescin into macaques before scanning, fluorescence adaptive optics scanning laser ophthalmoscopy (FAOSLO) can be utilized to image individual capillaries in the nerve fiber layer and determine the thickness of the nerve fiber layer itself. Vessel pattern and diameter for these capillaries have been measured throughout the regions scanned by FAOSLO. This has future applications for monitoring glaucoma patients who either have changes in nerve fiber layer thickness or alterations in vasculature from damage to the retina.

=== Comparison to retinal dissection and other imaging techniques ===
AOSLO represents an advantageous alternative to retinal dissection for a variety of reasons. Analysis of cone packing density before AOSLO was only possible on mounted eyes from eye donor banks. As this method could not measure changes to cones in living eyes, it could not be used to track retinal changes over time or eye movements. With the use of living subjects, AOSLO allows for these measurements as well as easier control of age and other confounding factors while maintaining similar anatomical results for cone packing density. Future clinical implications for AOSLO are also possible.

AOSLO compares favorably with other retinal imaging techniques as well. Fluorescein angiography uses injection of a fluorescein dye to image the back of the retina. It is a commonly used technique but it has a large number of side effects, including nausea in one fifth of patients and in some cases death from anaphylaxis. Optical coherence tomography (OCT) represents a powerful clinical tool for monitoring retinal physiology in patients. OCT uses low coherence interferometry to differentiate tissues within the eye and create a cross section of a living patients' retina non-invasively. It actually has greater axial resolution than AOSLO. However, AOSLO represents a method with much greater translational resolution than OCT and can thus be used to track minor lateral physical changes such as the effects of eye movements on the retina. A combination of AOSLO and OCT has recently been attempted in one apparatus to produce the first three-dimensional images of individual cone cells and illustrate the overall cone mosaic near the fovea at high speeds.

== See also ==
- Fundus photography
- Ophthalmoscopy
