= Thermal emission =

Thermal emission may refer to:

- Thermionic emission, the liberation of charged particles from an electrode due to thermal energy
- Thermal radiation, electromagnetic radiation generated by the thermal motion of particles in matter
