= Ferrofluid =

Liquid that is attracted by poles of a magnet

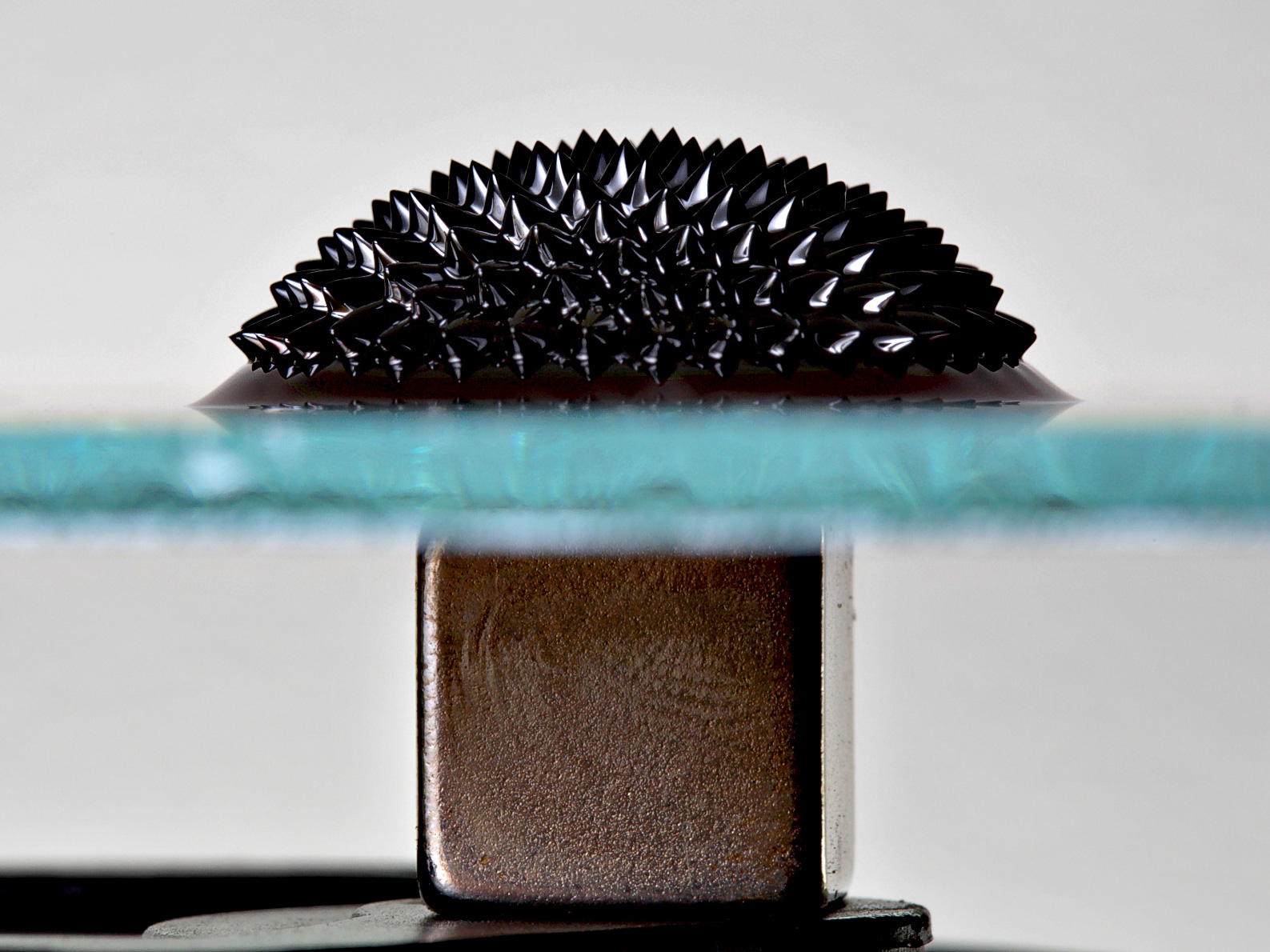
Ferrofluid on glass, with a neodymium magnet underneath

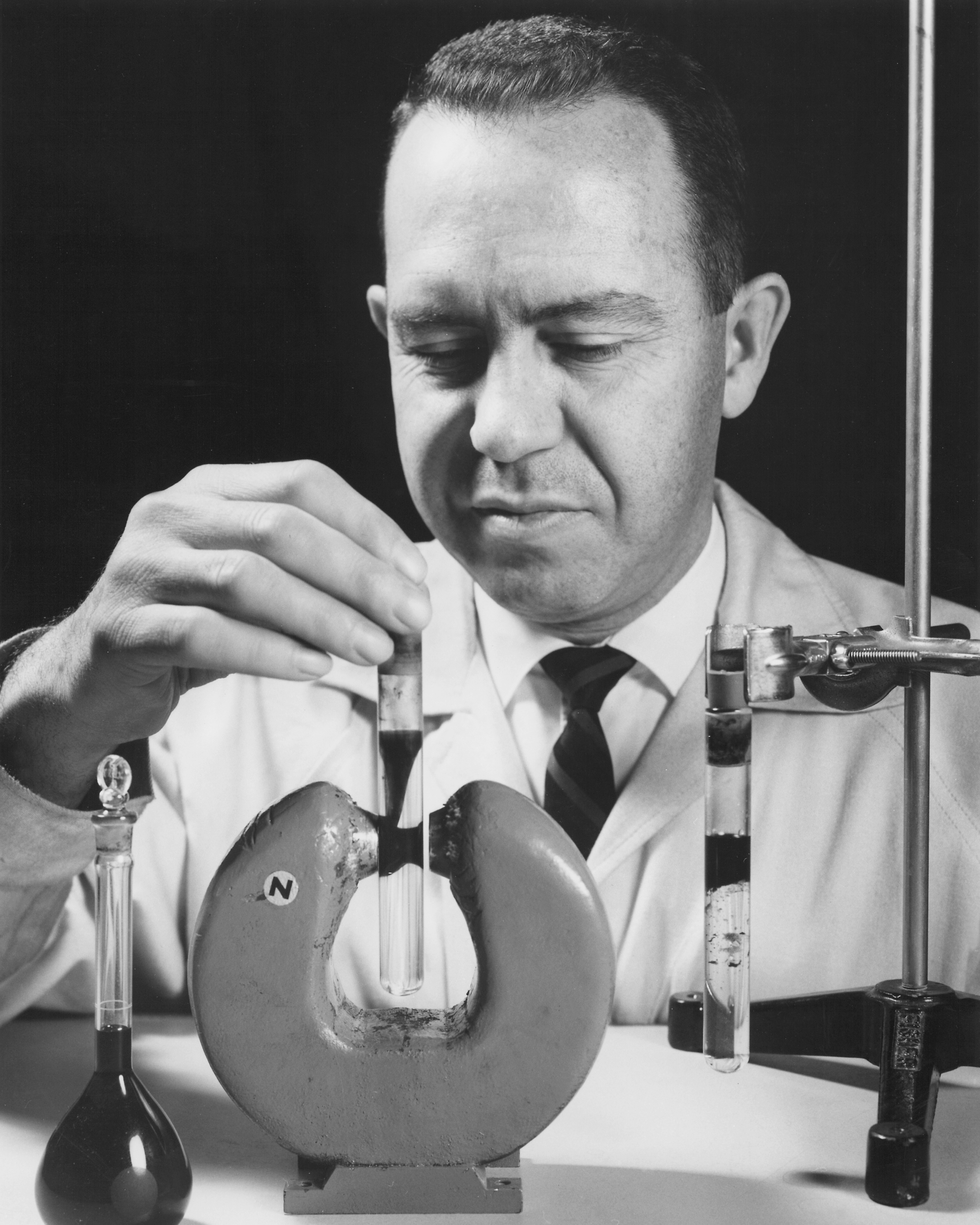
Steve Papell invented ferrofluid for NASA in 1963

Ferrofluid is a dark coloured liquid that is attracted to the poles of a magnet. It is a colloidal liquid made of nanoscale ferromagnetic or ferrimagnetic particles suspended inside a carrier fluid (usually an organic solvent or water). Each magnetic particle is thoroughly coated with a surfactant to inhibit clumping. Large ferromagnetic particles can be ripped out of the homogeneous colloidal mixture, forming a separate clump of magnetic dust when exposed to strong magnetic fields. The magnetic attraction of tiny nanoparticles is weak enough that the surfactant's van der Waals force is sufficient to prevent magnetic clumping or agglomeration. Ferrofluids usually do not retain magnetization in the absence of an externally applied field and thus are often classified as "superparamagnets" rather than ferromagnets.

In contrast to ferrofluids, magnetorheological fluids (MR fluids) are magnetic fluids with larger particles. That is, a ferrofluid contains primarily nanoparticles, while an MR fluid contains primarily micrometre-scale particles. The particles in a ferrofluid are suspended by Brownian motion and generally will not settle under normal conditions, while particles in an MR fluid are too heavy to be suspended by Brownian motion. Particles in an MR fluid will therefore settle over time because of the inherent density difference between the particles and their carrier fluid. As a result, ferrofluids and MR fluids have very different applications.

A process for making a ferrofluid was invented in 1963 by NASA's Steve Papell to create liquid rocket fuel that could be drawn toward a fuel pump in a weightless environment by applying a magnetic field. The name ferrofluid was introduced, the process improved, more highly magnetic liquids synthesized, additional carrier liquids discovered, and the physical chemistry elucidated by R. E. Rosensweig and colleagues. In addition Rosensweig evolved a new branch of fluid mechanics termed ferrohydrodynamics which sparked further theoretical research on intriguing physical phenomena in ferrofluids. In 2019, researchers at the University of Massachusetts and Beijing University of Chemical Technology succeeded in creating a permanently magnetic ferrofluid which retains its magnetism when the external magnetic field is removed. The researchers also found that the droplet's magnetic properties were preserved even if the shape was physically changed or it was divided.

== Description ==
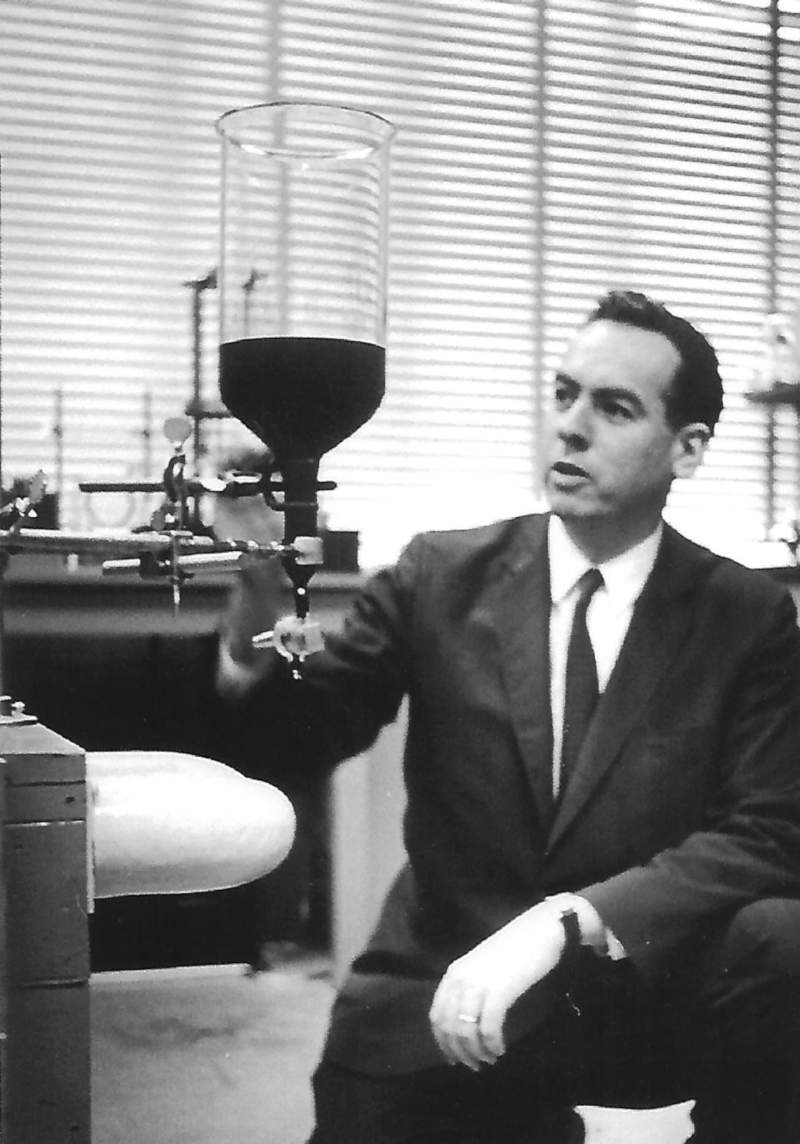
R. E. Rosensweig with ferrofluid in his lab (1965)

Ferrofluids are composed of very small nanoscale particles (diameter usually 10 nanometers or less) of magnetite, hematite or some other compound containing iron, and a liquid (usually oil). This is small enough for thermal agitation to disperse them evenly within a carrier fluid, and for them to contribute to the overall magnetic response of the fluid. This is similar to the way that the ions in an aqueous paramagnetic salt solution (such as an aqueous solution of copper(II) sulfate or manganese(II) chloride) make the solution paramagnetic. The composition of a typical ferrofluid is about 5% magnetic solids, 10% surfactant and 85% carrier, by volume. The different synthesis approaches adopted for preparing magnetic nanoparticles and nanoparticle formation mechanisms, functionalizing them with different capping agents, etc, are discussed in the recent review article.

Particles in ferrofluids are dispersed in a liquid, often using a surfactant, and thus ferrofluids are colloidal suspensions – materials with properties of more than one state of matter. In this case, the two states of matter are the solid metal and liquid it is in. This ability to change phases with the application of a magnetic field allows them to be used as seals, lubricants, and may open up further applications in future nanoelectromechanical systems.

True ferrofluids are stable. This means that the solid particles do not agglomerate or phase separate even in extremely strong magnetic fields. However, the surfactant tends to break down over time (a few years), and eventually the nano-particles will agglomerate, and they will separate out and no longer contribute to the fluid's magnetic response.

The term magnetorheological fluid (MRF) refers to liquids similar to ferrofluids (FF) that solidify in the presence of a magnetic field. Magnetorheological fluids have micrometre scale magnetic particles that are one to three orders of magnitude larger than those of ferrofluids.

However, ferrofluids lose their magnetic properties at sufficiently high temperatures, known as the Curie temperature.

=== Normal-field instability ===
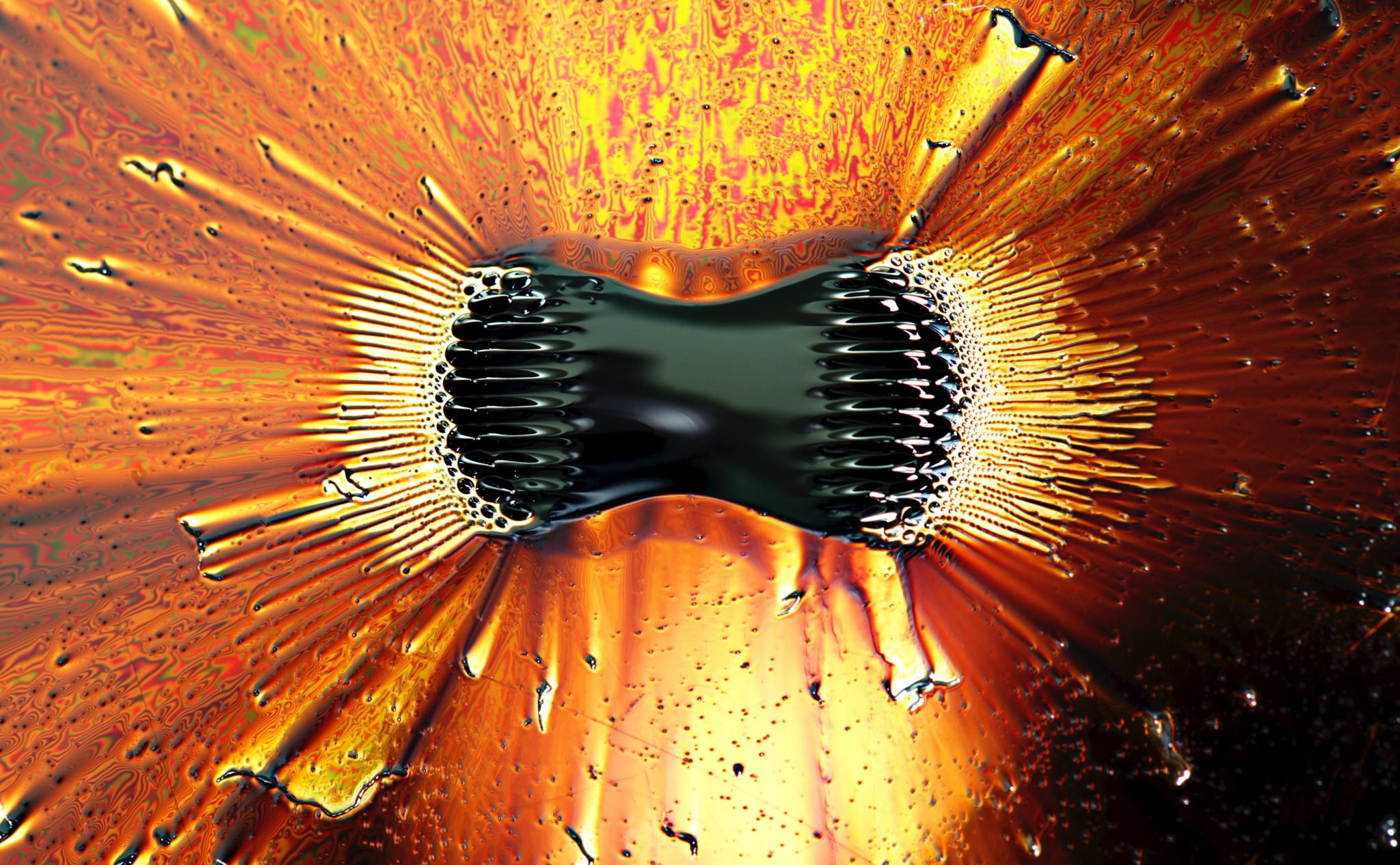
Ferrofluid is the oily substance collecting at the poles of a magnet which is underneath the brown oil.

When a paramagnetic fluid is subjected to a strong vertical magnetic field, the surface forms a regular pattern of peaks and valleys. This effect is known as the Rosensweig or normal-field instability. The instability is driven by the magnetic field; it can be explained by considering which shape of the fluid minimizes the total energy of the system.

From the point of view of magnetic energy, peaks and valleys are energetically favorable. In the corrugated configuration, the magnetic field is concentrated in the peaks; since the fluid is more easily magnetized than the air, this lowers the magnetic energy. In consequence the spikes of fluid ride the field lines out into space until there is a balance of the forces involved.

At the same time the formation of peaks and valleys is resisted by gravity and surface tension. It requires energy both to move fluid out of the valleys and up into the spikes, and to increase the surface area of the fluid. In summary, the formation of the corrugations increases the surface free energy and the gravitational energy of the liquid, but reduces the magnetic energy. The corrugations will only form above a critical magnetic field strength, when the reduction in magnetic energy outweighs the increase in surface and gravitation energy terms.

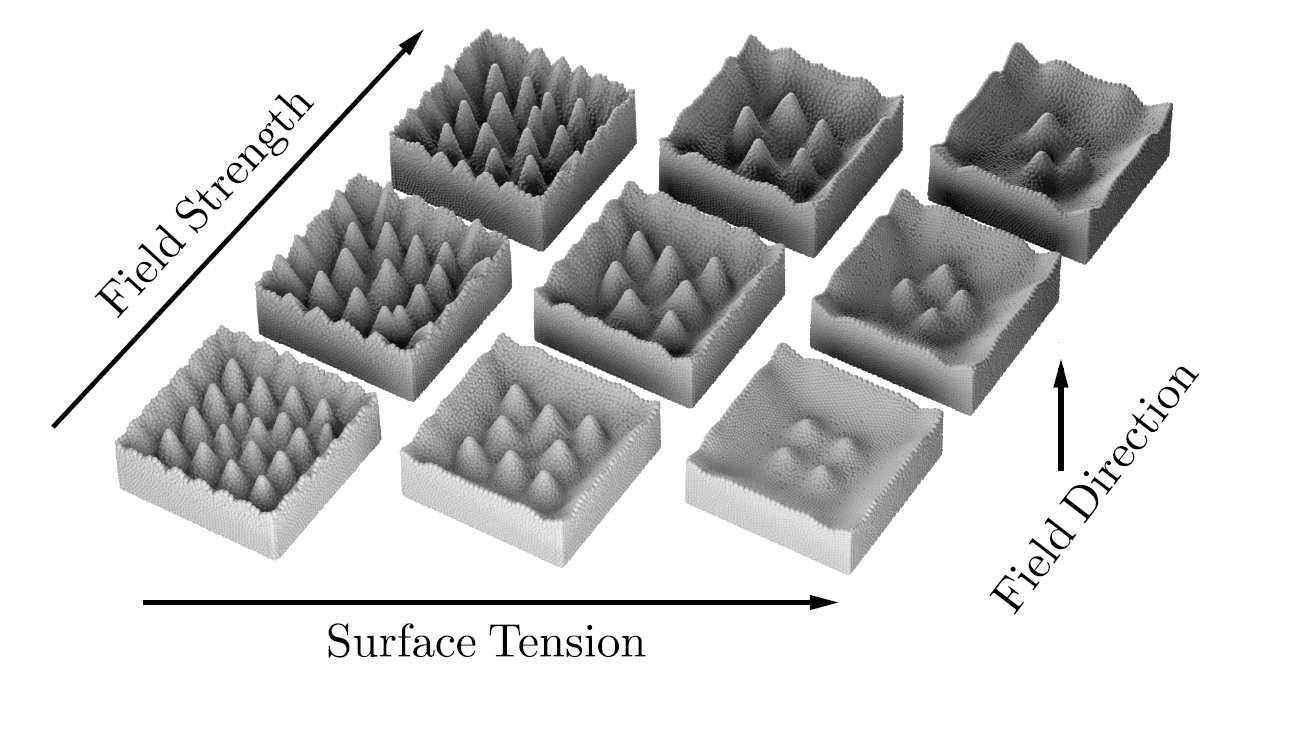
Ferrofluid simulations for different parameters of surface tension and magnetic field strengths

Ferrofluids have an exceptionally high magnetic susceptibility and the critical magnetic field for the onset of the corrugations can be realised by a small bar magnet.

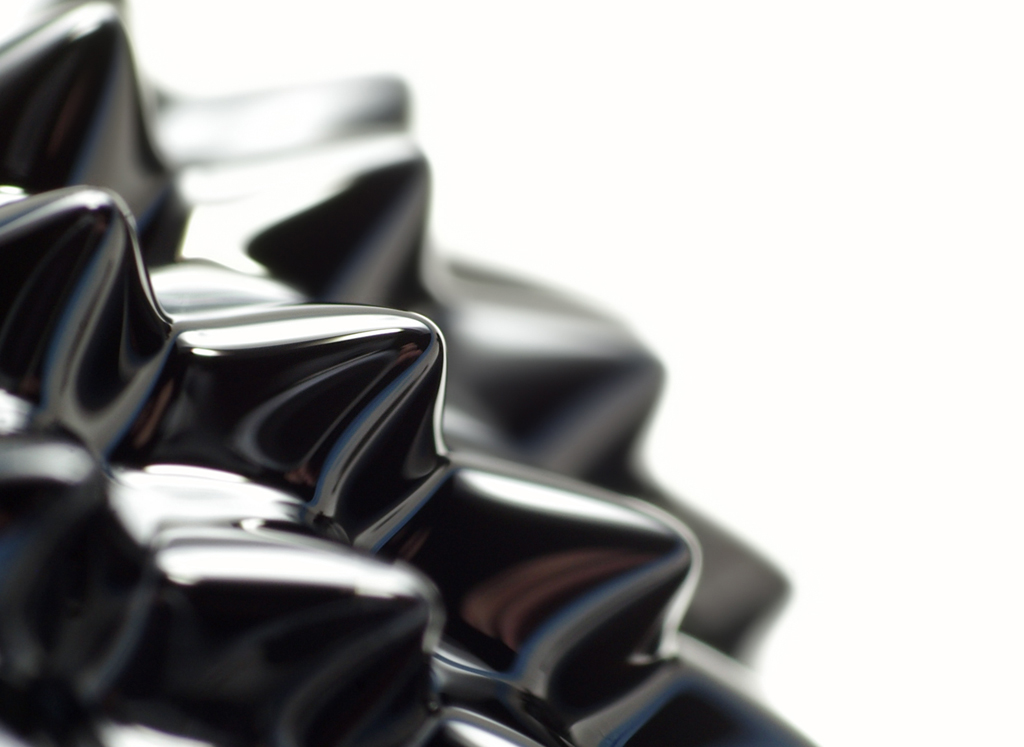
Macrophotograph of ferrofluid influenced by a magnet.

=== Common ferrofluid surfactants ===
The soapy surfactants used to coat the nanoparticles include, but are not limited to:

- oleic acid
- tetramethylammonium hydroxide
- citric acid
- soy lecithin

These surfactants prevent the nanoparticles from clumping together, so the particles neither fall out of suspension nor clump into a pile of magnetic dust near the magnet. The magnetic particles in an ideal ferrofluid never settle out, even when exposed to a strong magnetic field. A surfactant has a polar head and non-polar tail (or vice versa), one of which adsorbs to a nanoparticle, while the non-polar tail (or polar head) sticks out into the carrier medium, forming an inverse or regular micelle, respectively, around the particle. Electrostatic repulsion then prevents agglomeration of the particles.

While surfactants are useful in prolonging the settling rate in ferrofluids, they also hinder the fluid's magnetic properties (specifically, the fluid's magnetic saturation). The addition of surfactants (or any other foreign particles) decreases the packing density of the ferroparticles while in its activated state, thus decreasing the fluid's on-state viscosity, resulting in a "softer" activated fluid. While the on-state viscosity (the "hardness" of the activated fluid) is less of a concern for some ferrofluid applications, it is a primary fluid property for the majority of their commercial and industrial applications and therefore a compromise must be met when considering on-state viscosity versus the settling rate of a ferrofluid.

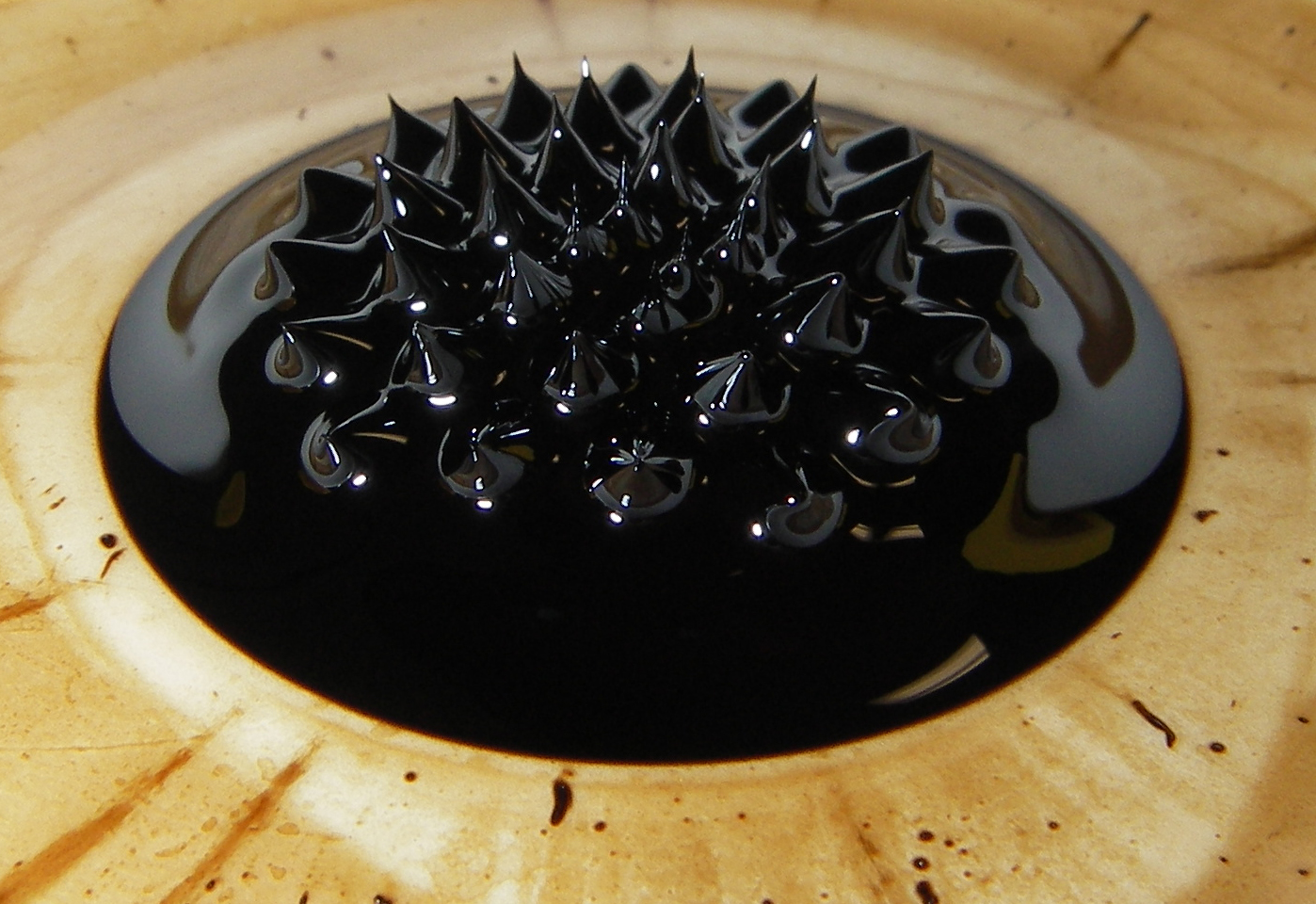
A ferrofluid in a magnetic field showing normal-field instability caused by a neodymium magnet beneath the dish

== Applications ==
=== Current ===
==== Electronic devices ====
Ferrofluids are used to form liquid seals around the spinning drive shafts in hard disks. The rotating shaft is surrounded by magnets. A small amount of ferrofluid, placed in the gap between the magnet and the shaft, will be held in place by its attraction to the magnet. The fluid of magnetic particles forms a barrier which prevents debris from entering the interior of the hard drive. According to engineers at Ferrotec, ferrofluid seals on rotating shafts typically withstand 3 to 4 psi; additional seals can be stacked to form assemblies capable of withstanding higher pressures.

==== Mechanical engineering ====
Ferrofluids have friction-reducing capabilities. If applied to the surface of a strong enough magnet, such as one made of neodymium, it can cause the magnet to glide across smooth surfaces with minimal resistance.

==== Materials science research ====
Ferrofluids can be used to image magnetic domain structures on the surface of ferromagnetic materials using a technique developed by Francis Bitter.

==== Loudspeakers ====
Starting in 1973, ferrofluids have been used in loudspeakers to remove heat from the voice coil, and to passively damp the movement of the cone. They reside in what would normally be the air gap around the voice coil, held in place by the speaker's magnet. Since ferrofluids are paramagnetic, they obey Curie's law and thus become less magnetic at higher temperatures. A strong magnet placed near the voice coil (which produces heat) will attract cold ferrofluid more than hot ferrofluid thus pushing the heated ferrofluid away from the electric voice coil and toward a heat sink. This is a relatively efficient cooling method which requires no additional energy input.

Bob Berkowitz of Acoustic Research began studying ferrofluid in 1972, using it to damp resonance of a tweeter. Dana Hathaway of Epicure in Massachusetts was using ferrofluid for tweeter damping in 1974, and he noticed the cooling mechanism. Fred Becker and Lou Melillo of Becker Electronics were also early adopters in 1976, with Melillo joining Ferrofluidics and publishing a paper in 1980. In concert sound, Showco began using ferrofluid in 1979 for cooling woofers. Panasonic was the first Asian manufacturer to put ferrofluid in commercial loudspeakers, in 1979. The field grew rapidly in the early 1980s. Today, some 300 million sound-generating transducers per year are produced with ferrofluid inside, including speakers installed in laptops, cell phones, headphones and earbuds.

==== Cell separations ====
Ferrofluids conjugated with antibodies or common capture agents such as Streptavidin (SA) or rat anti-mouse Ig (RAM) are used in immunomagnetic separation, a subset of cell sorting. These conjugated ferrofluids are used to bind to target cells, and then magnetically separate them from a cell mixture using a low-gradient magnetic separator. These ferrofluids have applications such as cell therapy, gene therapy, cellular manufacturing, among others.

==== Audio-visualization ====
On the aesthetic side, ferrofluids can be displayed to visualize sound. For that purpose, the blob of ferrofluid is suspended in a clear liquid. An electromagnet acts on the shape of the ferrofluid in response to the volume or the audio frequency of the music, allowing it to selectively react to a song's treble or bass.

==== Ferrolens ====
A magneto-optic device and magnetic-field flux viewer dynamic optic lens can be created by using a superparamagnetic thin-film encapsulated and sealed between two optic flat glasses. The thin film is made of a heavily diluted, almost transparent ferrofluid that is several microns thick. The ferrolens has an LED ring array around its perimeter that illuminates it. When an external magnetic field is projected onto the surface of the thin film, it produces a 2D flux magnetic field imprint pattern, similar to the Faraday's classical iron filings experiment. This pattern includes depth of field information of the external field being displayed by the ferrolens device, despite the thin film having a finite thickness only of several microns (i.e. 10 to 20 μm).

=== Former ===
==== Medical applications ====
Several ferrofluids were marketed for use as contrast agents in magnetic resonance imaging, which depend on the difference in magnetic relaxation times of different tissues to provide contrast. Several agents were introduced and then withdrawn from the market, including Feridex I.V. (also known as Endorem and ferumoxides), discontinued in 2008; resovist (also known as Cliavist), 2001 to 2009; Sinerem (also known as Combidex), withdrawn in 2007; Lumirem (also known as Gastromark), 1996 to 2012; Clariscan (also known as PEG-fero, Feruglose, and NC100150), development of which was discontinued due to safety concerns.

=== Future ===
==== Spacecraft propulsion ====
Ferrofluids can be made to self-assemble nanometer-scale needle-like sharp tips under the influence of a magnetic field. When they reach a critical thinness, the needles begin emitting jets that might be used in the future as a thruster mechanism to propel small satellites such as CubeSats.

==== Analytical instrumentation ====
Ferrofluids have numerous optical applications because of their refractive properties; that is, each grain, a micromagnet, reflects light. These applications include measuring specific viscosity of a liquid placed between a polarizer and an analyzer, illuminated by a helium–neon laser.

==== Medical applications ====
Ferrofluids have been proposed for magnetic drug targeting. In this process the drugs would be attached to or enclosed within a ferrofluid and could be targeted and selectively released using magnetic fields.

It has also been proposed for targeted magnetic hyperthermia to convert electromagnetic energy into heat.

It has also been proposed in a form of nanosurgery to separate one tissue from another—for example a tumor from the tissue in which it has grown.

==== Heat transfer ====
An external magnetic field imposed on a ferrofluid with varying susceptibility (e.g., because of a temperature gradient) results in a nonuniform magnetic body force, which leads to a form of heat transfer called thermomagnetic convection. This form of heat transfer can be useful when conventional convection heat transfer is inadequate; e.g., in miniature microscale devices or under reduced gravity conditions.

Magnetic field tunable thermal conductivity (~300% enhancement of thermal conductivity) was demonstrated in 2007. Such a large enhancement in k was attributed to the efficient transport of heat through percolating nanoparticle paths. Special magnetic nanofluids with tunable thermal conductivity to viscosity ratio can be used as multifunctional 'smart materials' that can remove heat and also arrest vibrations (damper). Such fluids may find applications in microfluidic devices and microelectromechanical systems (MEMS). A review on the tunable thermal conductivity and rheology of ferrofluid was published recently.

==== Optics ====
Research is under way to create an adaptive optics shape-shifting magnetic mirror from ferrofluid for Earth-based astronomical telescopes.

Optical filters are used to select different wavelengths of light. The replacement of filters is cumbersome, especially when the wavelength is changed continuously with tunable-type lasers. Optical filters tunable for different wavelengths by varying the magnetic field can be built using ferrofluid emulsion.

==== Energy harvesting ====
Ferrofluids enable the harvesting of vibration energy from the environment. Existing methods of harvesting low frequency (<100 Hz) vibrations require the use of solid resonant structures. With ferrofluids, energy harvester designs no longer need solid structure. One example of ferrofluid based energy harvesting is to place the ferrofluid inside a container to use external mechanical vibrations to generate electricity inside a coil wrapped around the container surrounded by a permanent magnet. First a ferrofluid is placed inside a container that is wrapped with a coil of wire. The ferrofluid is then externally magnetized using a permanent magnet. When external vibrations cause the ferrofluid to slosh around in the container, there is a change in magnetic flux fields with respect to the coil of wire. Through Faraday's law of electromagnetic induction, voltage is induced in the coil of wire due to change in magnetic flux.

== See also ==
- Continuum mechanics – Branch of physics which studies the behavior of materials modeled as continuous media
- Electrorheological fluid – Type of chemical suspension
- Fluid mechanics – Branch of physics
- Magnetic field viewing film – Film used to visualize invisible magnetic fields of an object
- Magnetic ionic liquid – Salt in the liquid state
- Magnetohydrodynamics – Model of electrically conducting fluids
- Magnetorheological fluid – Smart fluid whose viscosity increases in a magnetic field
- Plasma physics – State of matter
- Smart fluid – Fluid whose properties can be changed by applying an electric or magnetic field
- List of textbooks in electromagnetism

== Bibliography ==
- Andelman, David; Rosensweig, Ronald E. (2009). "The Phenomenology of Modulated Phases: From Magnetic Solids and Fluids to Organic Films and Polymers". In Tsori, Yoav; Steiner, Ullrich (eds.). Polymers, liquids and colloids in electric fields: interfacial instabilities, orientation and phase transitions. pp. 1–56. Bibcode:2009plce.book.....T. doi:10.1142/7266. ISBN 978-981-4271-68-4.
- Berger, Patricia; Adelman, Nicholas B.; Beckman, Katie J.; Campbell, Dean J.; Ellis, Arthur B.; Lisensky, George C. (1999). "Preparation and Properties of an Aqueous Ferrofluid". Journal of Chemical Education. 76 (7). American Chemical Society (ACS): 943. Bibcode:1999JChEd..76..943B. doi:10.1021/ed076p943. ISSN 0021-9584.
