= 51 Eridani b =

Extrasolar planet

51 Eri b
- Direct imaging of 51 Eri b

Discovery
- Discovered by: Macintosh et al.
- Discovery date: Dec 2014
- Detection method: Imaged

Orbital characteristics
- Semi-major axis: 9.1+0.6 −0.2 AU
- Eccentricity: 0.55+0.03 −0.07
- Orbital period (sidereal): 23.5+1.7 −0.9 years
- Inclination: 159°+6° −11°
- Longitude of ascending node: 58°+81° −48°
- Argument of periastron: 55°+51° −31°
- Star: 51 Eridani

Physical characteristics
- Mean radius: 1.36+0.07 −0.03 R_{J}
- Mass: 3.13+0.05 −0.04 M_{J}.
- Surface gravity: 3.75+0.09 −0.37 cgs
- Temperature: 800+20 −60 K (527 °C; 980 °F)

Atmosphere
- Composition by volume: methane, water vapour, ammonia, carbon dioxide

51 Eridani b is a "Jupiter-like" planet that orbits the young F0 V star 51 Eridani, in the constellation Eridanus. It is 96 light-years (29 parsecs) away from the Solar system, and it is approximately 20 million years old.

== Discovery ==
51 Eridani b was announced in August 2015, but was discovered in December 2014 using the Gemini Planet Imager, an international project led by the Kavli Institute for Particle Astrophysics and Cosmology. 51 Eridani b is the first exoplanet discovered by the Gemini Planet Imager. The Gemini Planet Imager was specifically created to discern and evaluate dim, newer planets orbiting bright stars through “direct imaging”. Direct imaging allows astronomers to use adaptive optics to sharpen the resolution of the image of a target star, then obstruct its starlight. Any residual incoming light is then scrutinized, and the brightest spots suggest a possible planet. Prior to the discovery of 51 Eridani b, each of the directly imaged worlds previously discovered had been gas giants many times the mass of Jupiter.

== Physical characteristics ==
51 Eridani b is a gas giant more massive than Jupiter. Predictions of substellar evolution models for its effective temperature and age yield a mass of 4.1±0.4 Jupiter masses (M_{J}), whereas self-consistent modelling of the planetary atmosphere and interior yields a mass of 3.13+0.05
−0.04 M_{J}. Astrometric data from the Hipparcos and Gaia spacecrafts can not yet measure the planet's mass, but has set an upper limit of 9.0 M_{J} at 3-sigma (99.7%) confidence. Its radius is about 1.36 times the radius of Jupiter (R_{J}), and its effective temperature is 800 K (527 °C; 980 °F), which is substantially hotter than the 128 K (−145 °C; −229 °F) average temperature of Jupiter, the planet in the Solar System of closest size. It orbits at a semi-major axis of 9.1 AU from its host star, has an orbital period of roughly 23.5 years, following an eccentric path with e = 0.55. The higher than expected eccentricity indicates that there is another body gravitationally perturbing the planet's orbit.

=== Atmosphere ===
51 Eridani b has relatively low C/O molar ratio of 0.38±0.09. The planet has the second strongest methane (CH_{4}) signature of any exoplanet, after Gliese 504 b. This methane signature, along with the low luminosity of the object, should give additional clues as to how 51 Eridani b was formed. Astronomers also detected the presence of water vapour and ammonia (NH_{3}) in the planet's spectrum. Atmospheric modeling favors a low surface gravity and a partly cloudy atmosphere.

The detection of water and carbon dioxide (CO_{2}) in the planetary atmosphere was announced in 2025. It was the second time CO_{2} was directly (as opposed to by transit spectra) detected in an exoplanet.
