= Deformable mirror =

Mirror whose surface can be deformed

A deformable mirror can be used to correct wavefront errors in an astronomical telescope.

Deformable mirrors (DM) are mirrors whose surface can be deformed, in order to achieve wavefront control and correction of optical aberrations. Deformable mirrors are used in combination with wavefront sensors and real-time control systems in adaptive optics. In 2006 they found a new use in femtosecond pulse shaping.

The shape of a DM can be controlled with a speed that is appropriate for compensation of dynamic aberrations present in the optical system. In practice the DM shape should be changed much faster than the process to be corrected, as the correction process, even for a static aberration, may take several iterations.

A DM usually has many degrees of freedom. Typically, these degrees of freedom are associated with the mechanical actuators and it can be roughly taken that one actuator corresponds to one degree of freedom.

== Deformable mirror parameters ==
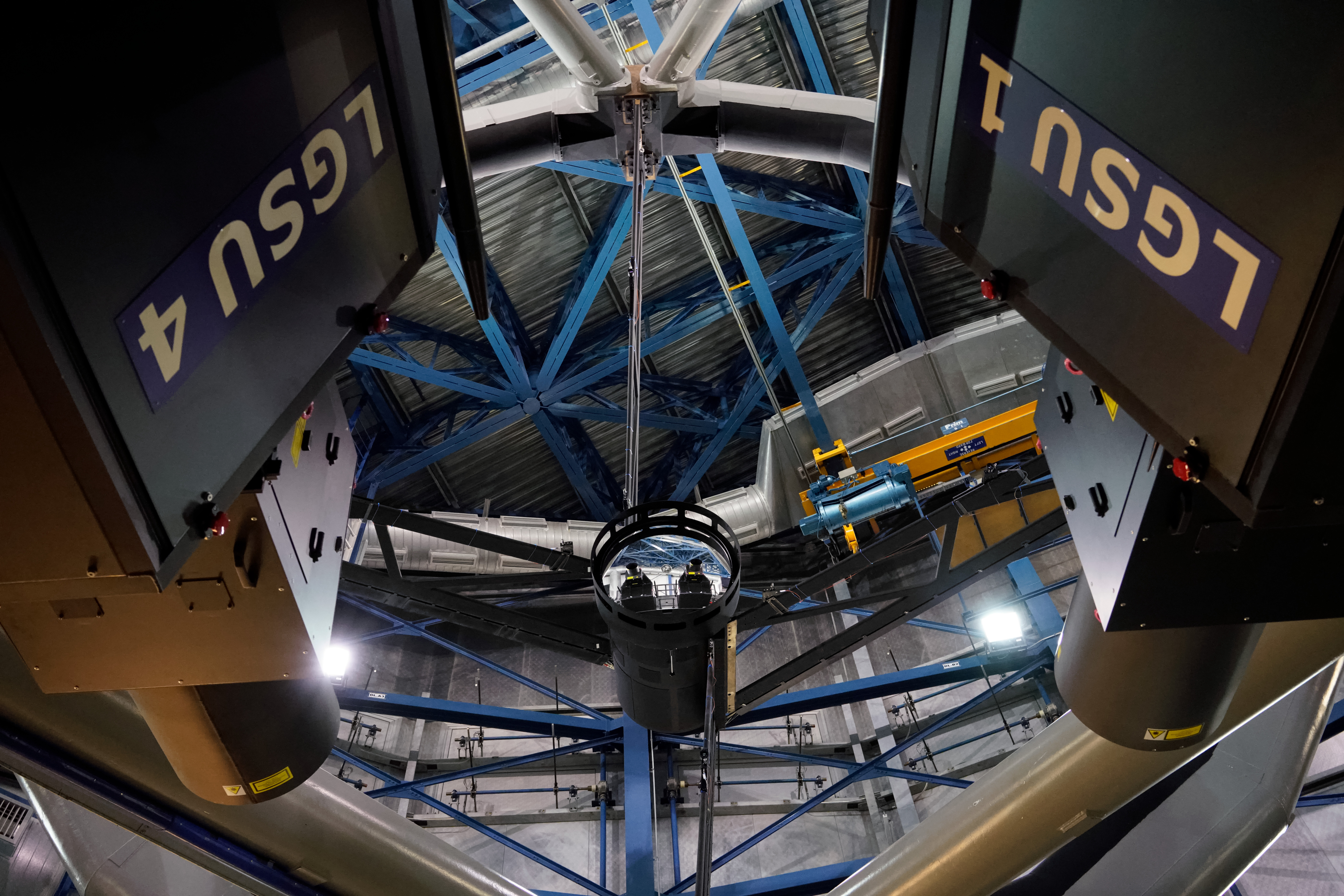
The VLT’s Deformable Secondary Mirror

Number of actuators determines the number of degrees of freedom (wavefront inflections) the mirror can correct. It is very common to compare an arbitrary DM to an ideal device that can perfectly reproduce wavefront modes in the form of Zernike polynomials. For predefined statistics of aberrations a deformable mirror with M actuators can be equivalent to an ideal Zernike corrector with N (usually N < M) degrees of freedom. For correction of the atmospheric turbulence, elimination of low-order Zernike terms usually results in significant improvement of the image quality, while further correction of the higher-order terms introduces less significant improvements. For strong and rapid wavefront error fluctuations such as shocks and wake turbulence typically encountered in high-speed aerodynamic flowfields, the number of actuators, actuator pitch and stroke determine the maximum wavefront gradients that can be compensated for.

Actuator pitch is the distance between actuator centers. Deformable mirrors with large actuator pitch and large number of actuators are bulky and expensive.

Actuator stroke is the maximum possible actuator displacement, typically in positive or negative excursions from some central null position. Stroke typically ranges from ±1 to ±30 micrometres. Free actuator stroke limits the maximum amplitude of the corrected wavefront, while the inter-actuator stroke limits the maximum amplitude and gradients of correctable higher-order aberrations.

Influence function is the characteristic shape corresponding to the mirror response to the action of a single actuator. Different types of deformable mirrors have different influence functions, moreover the influence functions can be different for different actuators of the same mirror. Influence function that covers the whole mirror surface is called a "modal" function, while localized response is called "zonal".

Actuator coupling shows how much the movement of one actuator will displace its neighbors. All "modal" mirrors have large cross-coupling, which in fact is good as it secures the high quality of correction of smooth low-order optical aberrations that usually have the highest statistical weight.

Response time shows how quickly the mirror will react to the control signal. Can vary from microseconds (MEMS and magnetics mirrors) to tens of seconds for thermally controlled DM's.

Hysteresis and creep are nonlinear actuation effects that decrease the precision of the response of the deformable mirror. For different concepts, the hysteresis can vary from zero (electrostatically actuated mirrors) to tens of percent for mirrors with piezoelectric actuators. Hysteresis is a residual positional error from previous actuator position commands, and limits the mirror ability to work in a feedforward mode, outside of a feedback loop.

== Deformable mirror concepts ==
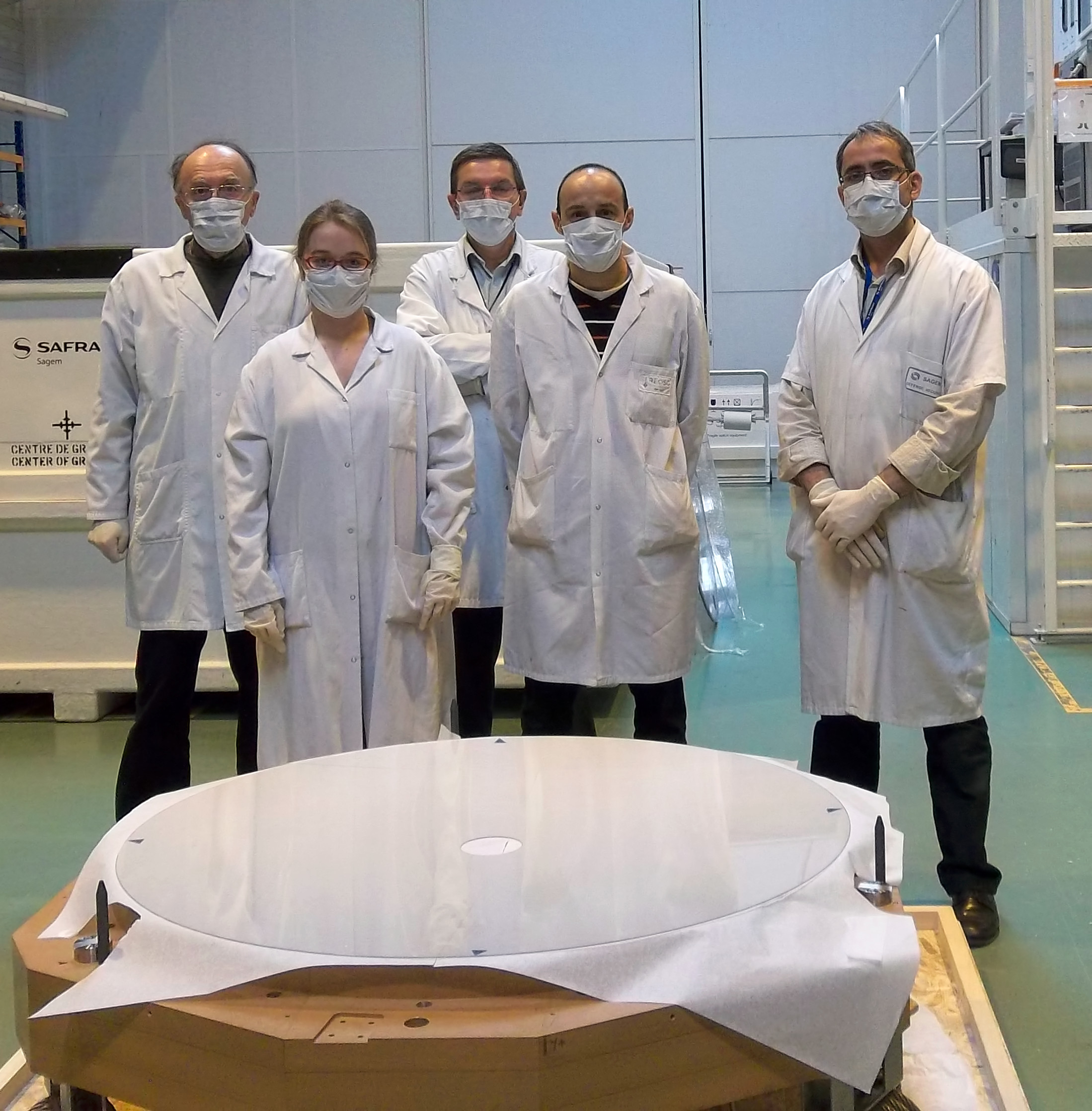
Thin shell mirror for ESO's Very Large Telescope Adaptive Optics Facility. The shell is 1120 millimetres across but just 2 millimetres thick.

Segmented concept mirrors are formed by independent flat mirror segments. Each segment can move a small distance back and forth to approximate the average value of the wavefront over the patch area. Advantageously, these mirrors have little or zero cross-talk between actuators. Stepwise approximation works poorly for smooth continuous wavefronts. Sharp edges of the segments and gaps between the segments contribute to light scattering, limiting the applications to those not sensitive to scattered light. Considerable improvement of the performance of the segmented mirror can be achieved by the introduction of three degrees of freedom per segment: piston, tip and tilt. These mirrors require three times as many actuators compared to piston-segmented mirrors. This concept was used for fabrication of large segmented primary mirrors for the Keck telescopes, the James Webb Space Telescope, and the future E-ELT. Numerous methods exist to accurately co-phase the segments and reduce the diffraction patterns introduced by the segment shapes and gaps. Future large space-based telescopes, such as the NASA Large UV Optical Infrared Surveyor will also possess a segmented primary mirror. The development of robust methods to increase the contrast is key for the direct imaging and characterization of exoplanets.

Continuous faceplate concept mirrors with discrete actuators are formed by the front surface of a thin deformable membrane. The shape of the plate is controlled by a number of discrete actuators that are fixed to its back side. The shape of the mirror depends on the combination of forces applied to the faceplate, boundary conditions (the way the plate is fixed to the mirror) and the geometry and the material of the plate. These mirrors allow smooth wavefront control with very large - up to several thousands - degrees of freedom.

Magnetic concept mirrors consist of a thin flexible continuous membrane actuated by voicecoils and magnets. This technology allows great design flexibility to achieve very different performances. Depending on the design choices made, they can achieve unrivaled stroke - up to a hundred microns of deformation - or very high speed - <ms timeframe. As the membrane is a single sheet of material, very high optical quality is also achievable. This technology can exhibit good stability and keep its shape almost unchanged for weeks. The actuator count can range from several tens of actuators to several thousand actuators.

MEMS concept mirrors are fabricated using bulk and surface micromachining technologies. They consist of a thin reflective membrane controlled by a multitude of actuators. MEMS mirrors could break the high price threshold of conventional adaptive optics. They enable a higher actuator count at a more cost-effective price allowing for accurate wave-front correction. MEMS mirrors offer fast response times from the actuators with limited hysteresis. An additional benefit is that micromachining technologies allow for the benefit of economies of scale to create cheaper and lighter deformable mirrors with a greater number of actuators.

Membrane concept mirrors are formed by a thin conductive and reflective membrane stretched over a solid flat frame. The membrane can be deformed electrostatically by applying control voltages to electrostatic electrode actuators that can be positioned under or over the membrane. If there are any electrodes positioned over the membrane, they are transparent. It is possible to operate the mirror with only one group of electrodes positioned under the mirror. In this case, a bias voltage is applied to all electrodes, to make the membrane initially spherical. The membrane can move back and forth with respect to the reference sphere.

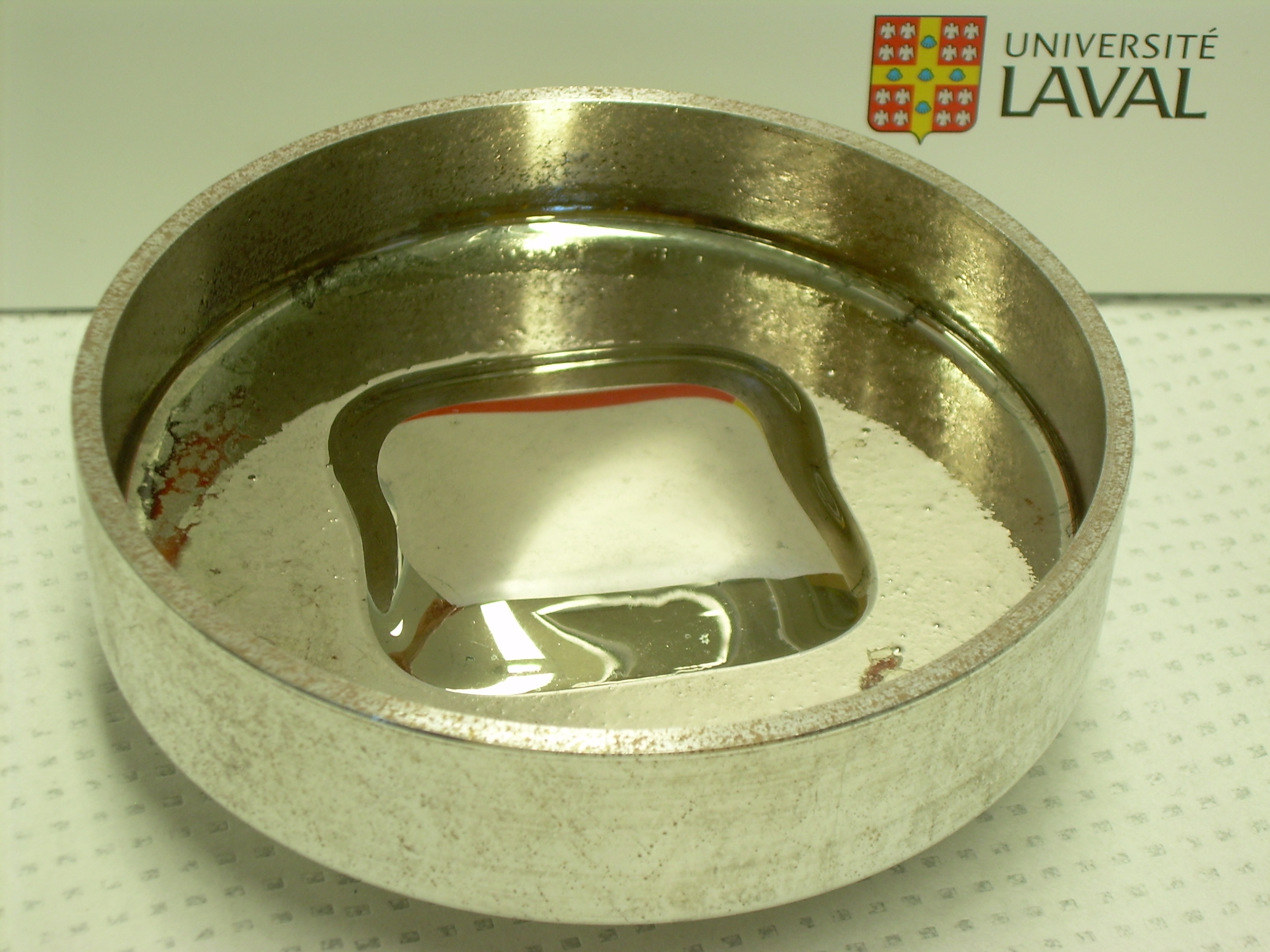
A ferrofluid deformable mirror

Bimorph concept mirrors are formed by two or more layers of different materials. One or more of (active) layers are fabricated from a piezoelectric or electrostrictive material. Electrode structure is patterned on the active layer to facilitate local response. The mirror is deformed when a voltage is applied to one or more of its electrodes, causing them to extend laterally, which results in local mirror curvature. Bimorph mirrors are rarely made with more than 100 electrodes.

Ferrofluid concept mirrors are liquid deformable mirrors made with a suspension of small (about 10 nm in diameter) ferromagnetic nanoparticles dispersed in a liquid carrier. In the presence of an external magnetic field, the ferromagnetic particles align with the field, the liquid becomes magnetized and its surface acquires a shape governed by the equilibrium between the magnetic, gravitational and surface tension forces. Using proper magnetic field geometries, any desired shape can be produced at the surface of the ferrofluid. This new concept offers a potential alternative for low-cost, high stroke and large number of actuators deformable mirrors.

== See also ==
- ALPAO
- Boston Micromachines Corporation
- CILAS
- Electrostatic-Pneumatic
- Ferrofluid mirror
- Microelectromechanical systems
- Wavefront sensor
