= Dyakonov =

Dyakonov (Russian: Дьяконов (masculine), Russian: Дьяконова (feminine)), Diakonoff, Diakonov, or Diakonof is a Russian surname meaning "a deacon's". Notable people with the surname include:

- Anatoly Dyakonov (1907–1972), Soviet general
- Alexey Diakonoff (1907–1989), Dutch-Russian entomologist
- Dmitry Dyakonov (1949–2012), Russian physicist
- Elena Diakonova, known as Gala Dalí, (1894–1982), Russian model and wife of artist Dalí
- Igor Diakonoff (1915–1999), linguist, translator, and historian of the Ancient Near East
- Kathryn Dyakanoff Seller (1884–1980), Alaska Native educator
- Nina Dyakonova (1915–2013), Russian researcher
- Yevgeny Dyakonov (1935–2006), Russian mathematician
- Vasily Dyakonov (1946–2012), governor of Krasnodar Krai
- Mikhail Dyakonov (born 1940), Russian physicist, discoverer of Dyakonov surface waves
- Pavel Dyakonov (born 1973), football player
- Tatyana Dyakonova (born 1970), Russian politician
