= Traveling plane wave =

Type of plane wave

The wavefronts of a traveling plane wave in three-dimensional space.

In mathematics and physics, a traveling plane wave is a special case of plane wave, namely a field whose evolution in time can be described as simple translation of its values at a constant wave speed $c$, along a fixed direction of propagation $\vec n$.

Such a field can be written as

$$F(\vec x, t)=G\left(\vec x \cdot \vec n - c t\right)\,$$

where $G(u)$ is a function of a single real parameter $u = d - c t$. The function $G$ describes the profile of the wave, namely the value of the field at time $t = 0$, for each displacement $d = \vec x \cdot \vec n$. For each displacement $d$, the moving plane perpendicular to $\vec n$ at distance $d + c t$ from the origin is called a wavefront. This plane too travels along the direction of propagation $\vec n$ with velocity $c$; and the value of the field is then the same, and constant in time, at every one of its points.

The wave $F$ may be a scalar or vector field; its values are the values of $G$.

A sinusoidal plane wave is a special case, when $G(u)$ is a sinusoidal function of $u$.

== Properties ==
A traveling plane wave can be studied by ignoring the dimensions of space perpendicular to the vector $\vec n$; that is, by considering the wave $F(z\vec n,t) = G(z - ct)$ on a one-dimensional medium, with a single position coordinate $z$.

For a scalar traveling plane wave in two or three dimensions, the gradient of the field is always collinear with the direction $\vec n$; specifically, $\nabla F(\vec x,t) = \vec n G'(\vec x \cdot \vec n - ct)$, where $G'$ is the derivative of $G$. Moreover, a traveling plane wave $F$ of any shape satisfies the partial differential equation

$$\nabla F = -\frac{\vec n}{c}\frac{\partial F}{\partial t}$$

Plane traveling waves are also special solutions of the wave equation in an homogeneous medium.

== See also ==
- Spherical wave
- Standing wave
