= Sommerfeld identity =

Result used in the theory of propagation of waves

The Sommerfeld identity is a mathematical identity, due Arnold Sommerfeld, used in the theory of propagation of waves,

$$\frac{{e^{ik R} }}
{R} = \int\limits_0^\infty I_0(\lambda r) e^{ - \mu \left| z \right| } \frac{{\lambda d \lambda}}{{\mu}}$$

where

$$\mu =
\sqrt {\lambda ^2  - k^2 }$$

is to be taken with positive real part, to ensure the convergence of the integral and its vanishing in the limit $z \rightarrow \pm \infty$ and

$$R^2=r^2+z^2$$.

Here, $R$ is the distance from the origin while $r$ is the distance from the central axis of a cylinder as in the $(r,\phi,z)$ cylindrical coordinate system. Here the notation for Bessel functions follows the German convention, to be consistent with the original notation used by Sommerfeld. The function $I_0(z)$ is the zeroth-order Bessel function of the first kind, better known by the notation $I_0(z)=J_0(iz)$ in English literature. This identity is known as the Sommerfeld identity in radial-spectral form.

In alternative notation, the Sommerfeld identity can be more easily seen as an expansion of a spherical wave in terms of cylindrically-symmetric waves:

$$\frac{{e^{ik_0 r} }}
{r} = i\int\limits_0^\infty  {dk_\rho  \frac{{k_\rho  }}
{{k_z }}J_0 (k_\rho  \rho )e^{ik_z \left| z \right|} }$$

where

$$k_z=(k_0^2-k_\rho^2)^{1/2}$$

The notation used here is different from that above: $r$ is now the distance from the origin and $\rho$ is the radial distance in a cylindrical coordinate system defined as $(\rho,\phi,z)$. The physical interpretation is that a spherical wave can be expanded into a summation of cylindrical waves in $\rho$ direction, multiplied by a two-sided plane wave in the $z$ direction; see the Jacobi-Anger expansion. The summation has to be taken over all the wavenumbers $k_\rho$.

The Sommerfeld identity is closely related to the two-dimensional Fourier transform with cylindrical symmetry, i.e., the Hankel transform. It is found by transforming the spherical wave along the in-plane coordinates ($x$,$y$, or $\rho$, $\phi$) but not transforming along the height coordinate $z$.

== Axial-spectral representation of the Sommerfeld identity ==
The radial forms above integrate over the transverse spectral variable λ (equivalently $k_\rho$), which leaves the axial dependence to appear through a two-sided exponential in $z$. A complementary form rather integrates over the axial wavenumber $k_z$, keeping the axial phase explicit and expressing the transverse dependence through a cylindrical (Hankel) wave:

$\frac{e^{ik_0R}}{R}=\frac{i}{2}\int^{\infty}_{-\infty}H_0^{(1)}(k_\rho \rho)e^{ik_z z} dk_z, \quad k_\rho = \sqrt{k_0^2-k_z^2},\ \text{Im}(k_\rho)\geq 0,$

where $\rho$ is the radial distance in the cylindrical system $(\rho, \phi, z)$, $R = \sqrt{\rho^2+z^2}$, and $H_0^{(1)}$ is the Hankel function of zeroth-order of the first kind. The branch of $k_\rho$ is chosen such that $H_0^{(1)}(k_\rho \rho)$ is representative of an outgoing wave for $k_z^2 < k_0^2$ and is evanescent for $k_z^2 > k_0^2$, which ensures convergence.

This form is obtained via the same spherical wave by transforming along thew axial coordinate $z$ alone, instead of along the in-place coordinates. This representation is used in spectral-domain analyses of cylindrical structures and layered media, where the $e^{ik_zz}$ factor allows axial and transverse operations to be separate, and where the Hankel-function argument makes the two-centre translation of cylindrical waves tractable (via Bessel-family addition theorems, for example).
