= Sinusoidal plane wave =

Type of plane wave

In physics, a sinusoidal plane wave is a special case of plane wave: a field whose value varies as a sinusoidal function of time and of the distance from some fixed plane. It is also called a monochromatic plane wave, with constant frequency (as in monochromatic radiation).

== Basic representation ==
For any position $\vec x$ in space and any time $t$, the value of such a field can be written as
$$F(\vec x, t) = A \cos\left(2\pi \nu (\vec x \cdot \hat n - c t) + \varphi\right)$$
where $\hat n$ is a unit-length vector, the direction of propagation of the wave, and "$\cdot$" denotes the dot product of two vectors. The parameter $A$, which may be a scalar or a vector, is called the amplitude of the wave; the coefficient $\nu$, a positive scalar, its spatial frequency; and the adimensional scalar $\varphi$, an angle in radians, is its initial phase or phase shift.

The scalar quantity $d = \vec x \cdot \hat n$ gives the (signed) displacement of the point $\vec x$ from the plane that is perpendicular to $\hat n$ and goes through the origin of the coordinate system. This quantity is constant over each plane perpendicular to $\hat n$.

At time $t = 0$, the field $F$ varies with the displacement $d$ as a sinusoidal function
$$F(\vec x, 0)=A \cos\left(2\pi \nu (\vec x \cdot \hat n) + \varphi\right)$$
The spatial frequency $\nu$ is the number of full cycles per unit of length along the direction $\hat n$. For any other value of $t$, the field values are displaced by the distance $c t$ in the direction $\hat n$. That is, the whole field seems to travel in that direction with velocity $c$.

For each displacement $d$, the moving plane perpendicular to $\hat n$ at distance $d + c t$ from the origin is called a wavefront. This plane lies at distance $d$ from the origin when $t = 0$, and travels in the direction $\hat n$ also with speed $c$; and the value of the field is then the same, and constant in time, at every one of its points.

A sinusoidal plane wave could be a suitable model for a sound wave within a volume of air that is small compared to the distance of the source (provided that there are no echos from nearly objects). In that case, $F(\vec x,t)\,$ would be a scalar field, the deviation of air pressure at point $\vec x$ and time $t$, away from its normal level.

At any fixed point $\vec x$, the field will also vary sinusoidally with time; it will be a scalar multiple of the amplitude $A$, between $+A$ and $-A$

When the amplitude $A$ is a vector orthogonal to $\hat n$, the wave is said to be transverse. Such waves may exhibit polarization, if $A$ can be oriented along two non-collinear directions. When $A$ is a vector collinear with $\hat n$, the wave is said to be longitudinal. These two possibilities are exemplified by the S (shear) waves and P (pressure) waves studied in seismology.

The formula above gives a purely "kinematic" description of the wave, without reference to whatever physical process may be causing its motion. In a mechanical or electromagnetic wave that is propagating through an isotropic medium, the vector $\hat n$ of the apparent propagation of the wave is also the direction in which energy or momentum is actually flowing. However, the two directions may be different in an anisotropic medium.(See also: Wave vector#Direction of the wave vector.)

== Alternative representations ==
The same sinusoidal plane wave $F$ above can also be expressed in terms of sine instead of cosine using the elementary identity $\cos a = \sin(a + \pi/2)$
$$F(\vec x, t)=A \sin\left(2\pi \nu (\vec x \cdot \hat n - c t) + \varphi'\right)$$
where $\varphi' = \varphi + \pi/2$. Thus the value and meaning of the phase shift depends on whether the wave is defined in terms of sine or co-sine.

Adding any integer multiple of $2\pi$ to the initial phase $\varphi$ has no effect on the field. Adding an odd multiple of $\pi$ has the same effect as negating the amplitude $A$. Assigning a negative value for the spatial frequency $\nu$ has the effect of reversing the direction of propagation, with a suitable adjustment of the initial phase.

At time equals zero a positive phase shift results in the wave being shifted toward the left.

As t increases the wave travels to the right and the value at a given point x oscillates sinusoidally.

Animation of a 3D plane wave. Each color represents a different phase of the wave.

The formula of a sinusoidal plane wave can be written in several other ways:

- $$F(\vec x,t)=A \cos (2\pi[(\vec x \cdot \hat n)/\lambda - t/T] + \varphi)$$
  Here $\lambda = 1/\nu$ is the wavelength, the distance between two wavefronts where the field is equal to the amplitude $A$; and $T = \lambda/c$ is the period of the field's variation over time, seen at any fixed point in space. Its reciprocal $f = 1/T$ is the temporal frequency of the wave measured in full cycles per unit of time.
- $$F(\vec x,t)=A \cos (k (\vec x \cdot \hat n) - \omega t + \varphi)$$
  Here $k = 2\pi\nu = 2\pi/\lambda$ is a parameter called the angular wave number (measured in radians per unit of length), and $\omega = 2\pi/T$ is angular frequency of the variation at a fixed point (in radians per unit of time).
- $$F(\vec x,t)=A \cos (2\pi(\vec x \cdot \vec \nu) - \omega t + \varphi)$$
  where $\vec \nu = \nu \hat n = \hat n/\lambda$ is the spatial frequency vector or wave vector, a three-dimensional vector $\vec \nu = (\nu_1,\nu_2,\nu_3)$ where $\nu_i$ is the number of full cycles that occur per unit of length, at any fixed time, along any straight line parallel to coordinate axis $i$.

== Complex exponential form ==
A plane sinusoidal wave may also be expressed in terms of the complex exponential function
$$e^{\mathrm{i} z} = \exp(\mathrm{i}z) = \cos z + \mathrm{i}\sin z$$
where $e$ is the base of the natural exponential function, and $\mathrm{i}$ is the imaginary unit, defined by the equation . With those tools, one defines the complex exponential plane wave as
$$U(\vec x,t)\;=\; A \exp[\mathrm{i}(2\pi\nu(\vec x\cdot\hat n - c t) +\varphi)]\;=\; A \exp[\mathrm{i}(2\pi\nu\vec x \cdot \vec v - \omega t + \varphi)]$$
where $A,\nu,\hat n,c,\vec v,\omega, \varphi$ are as defined for the (real) sinusoidal plane wave. This equation gives a field $U(\vec x,t)$ whose value is a complex number, or a vector with complex coordinates. The original wave expression is now simply the real part,
$$F(\vec x,t) = \operatorname{Re}{\left[U(\vec x,t)\right]}$$

To appreciate this equation's relationship to the earlier ones, below is this same equation expressed using sines and cosines. Observe that the first term equals the real form of the plane wave just discussed.

$$\begin{array}{rcccc}
U (\vec x, t ) &=& A \cos (2\pi\nu \hat n \cdot \vec x - \omega t + \varphi ) & + & \mathrm{i} A \sin (2\pi\nu \hat n \cdot \vec x - \omega t + \varphi ) \\[1ex]
U (\vec x, t ) &=& F (\vec x, t ) & + & \mathrm{i} A \sin (2\pi\nu \hat n \cdot \vec x - \omega t + \varphi )
\end{array}$$

The introduced complex form of the plane wave can be simplified by using a complex-valued amplitude $C\,$ substitute the real valued amplitude $A\,$.
Specifically, since the complex form
$$\exp[\mathrm{i}(2\pi\vec x \cdot \vec v - \omega t +\varphi)] \;=\; \exp[\mathrm{i}(2\pi\nu \hat n\cdot\vec x - \omega t )]\,e^{\mathrm{i} \varphi}$$
one can absorb the phase factor $e^{\mathrm{i} \varphi}$ into a complex amplitude by letting $C = A e^{\mathrm{i} \varphi}$, resulting in the more compact equation
$$U(\vec x,t)= C \exp[\mathrm{i}(2\pi\vec x\cdot\vec v - \omega t)]$$

While the complex form has an imaginary component, after the necessary calculations are performed in the complex plane, its real value (which corresponds to the wave one would actually physically observe or measure) can be extracted giving a real valued equation representing an actual plane wave.
$$\operatorname{Re}[U(\vec x,t)]= F (\vec x, t ) = A \cos (2\pi\nu \hat n \cdot \vec x - \omega t + \varphi )$$

The main reason one would choose to work with complex exponential form of plane waves is that complex exponentials are often algebraically easier to handle than the trigonometric sines and cosines. Specifically, the angle-addition rules are extremely simple for exponentials.

Additionally, when using Fourier analysis techniques for waves in a lossy medium, the resulting attenuation is easier to deal with using complex Fourier coefficients. If a wave is traveling through a lossy medium, the amplitude of the wave is no longer constant, and therefore the wave is strictly speaking no longer a true plane wave.

In quantum mechanics the solutions of the Schrödinger wave equation are by their very nature complex-valued and in the simplest instance take a form identical to the complex plane wave representation above. The imaginary component in that instance however has not been introduced for the purpose of mathematical expediency but is in fact an inherent part of the “wave”.

In special relativity, one can utilize an even more compact expression by using four-vectors.

- The four-position $\vec x = (ct,\vec x)$
- The four-wavevector $2\pi\nu \hat n = \left(\frac{\omega}{c},2\pi\nu \hat n\right)$
- The scalar product $2\pi\nu \hat n\cdot\vec x = \omega t - 2\pi\nu \hat n\cdot\vec x$

Thus,
$$U(\vec x,t)= C \exp[\mathrm{i}(2\pi\nu \hat n\cdot\vec x - \omega t )]$$
becomes
$$U(\vec x)= C \exp[-\mathrm{i}(2\pi\nu \hat n\cdot\vec x)]$$

== Applications ==
The equations describing electromagnetic radiation in a homogeneous dielectric medium admit as special solutions that are sinusoidal plane waves. In electromagnetism, the field $F$ is typically the electric field, magnetic field, or vector potential, which in an isotropic medium is perpendicular to the direction of propagation $\hat n$. The amplitude $A$ is then a vector of the same nature, equal to the maximum-strength field. The propagation speed $c$ will be the speed of light in the medium.

The equations that describe vibrations in a homogeneous elastic solid also admit solutions that are sinusoidal plane waves, both transverse and longitudinal. These two types have different propagation speeds, that depend on the density and the Lamé parameters of the medium.

The fact that the medium imposes a propagation speed means that the parameters $\omega$ and $k$ must satisfy a dispersion relation characteristic of the medium. The dispersion relation is often expressed as a function, $\omega(k)$. The ratio $\omega/|k|$ gives the magnitude of the phase velocity, and the derivative $\partial\omega / \partial k$ gives the group velocity. For electromagnetism in an isotropic medium with index of refraction $r$, the phase velocity is $c/r$, which equals the group velocity if the index is not frequency-dependent.

In linear uniform media, a general solution to the wave equation can be expressed as a superposition of sinusoidal plane waves. This approach is known as the angular spectrum method. The form of the planewave solution is actually a general consequence of translational symmetry. More generally, for periodic structures having discrete translational symmetry, the solutions take the form of Bloch waves, most famously in crystalline atomic materials but also in photonic crystals and other periodic wave equations. As another generalization, for structures that are only uniform along one direction $x$ (such as a waveguide along the $x$ direction), the solutions (waveguide modes) are of the form $exp[i(kx-\omega t)]$ multiplied by some amplitude function $a(y,z)$. This is a special case of a separable partial differential equation.

== Polarized electromagnetic plane waves ==
Linearly polarized light

Circularly polarized light

The blocks of vectors represent how the magnitude and direction of the electric field is constant for an entire plane perpendicular to the direction of travel.

Represented in the first illustration toward the right is a linearly polarized, electromagnetic wave. Because this is a plane wave, each blue vector, indicating the perpendicular displacement from a point on the axis out to the sine wave, represents the magnitude and direction of the electric field for an entire plane that is perpendicular to the axis.

Represented in the second illustration is a circularly polarized, electromagnetic plane wave. Each blue vector indicating the perpendicular displacement from a point on the axis out to the helix, also represents the magnitude and direction of the electric field for an entire plane perpendicular to the axis.

In both illustrations, along the axes is a series of shorter blue vectors which are scaled down versions of the longer blue vectors. These shorter blue vectors are extrapolated out into the block of black vectors which fill a volume of space. Notice that for a given plane, the black vectors are identical, indicating that the magnitude and direction of the electric field is constant along that plane.

In the case of the linearly polarized light, the field strength from plane to plane varies from a maximum in one direction, down to zero, and then back up to a maximum in the opposite direction.

In the case of the circularly polarized light, the field strength remains constant from plane to plane but its direction steadily changes in a rotary type manner.

Not indicated in either illustration is the electric field’s corresponding magnetic field which is proportional in strength to the electric field at each point in space but is at a right angle to it. Illustrations of the magnetic field vectors would be virtually identical to these except all the vectors would be rotated 90 degrees about the axis of propagation so that they were perpendicular to both the direction of propagation and the electric field vector.

The ratio of the amplitudes of the electric and magnetic field components of a plane wave in free space is known as the free-space wave-impedance, equal to 376.730313 ohms.

== See also ==
- Angular spectrum method
- Collimated beam
- Plane waves in a vacuum
- Plane-wave expansion
- Rectilinear propagation
- Wave equation
