= Weyl expansion =

Outgoing spherical wave as a linear combination of plane waves

In physics, the Weyl expansion, also known as the Weyl identity or angular spectrum expansion, expresses an outgoing spherical wave as a linear combination of plane waves. In a Cartesian coordinate system, it can be denoted as

$$\frac{e^{-i k_0 r}}{r}=\frac{1}{ 2\pi i} \int_{-\infty}^{\infty} \int_{-\infty}^{\infty} dk_x dk_y e^{-i(k_x x + k_y y)} \frac{e^{-ik_z |z|}}{k_z}$$,

where $k_x$, $k_y$ and $k_z$ are the wavenumbers in their respective coordinate axes:

$$k_0=\sqrt{k_x^2+k_y^2+k_z^2}$$.

The expansion is named after Hermann Weyl, who published it in 1919. The Weyl identity is largely used to characterize the reflection and transmission of spherical waves at planar interfaces; it is often used to derive the Green's functions for Helmholtz equation in layered media. The expansion also covers evanescent wave components. It is often preferred to the Sommerfeld identity when the field representation is needed to be in Cartesian coordinates.

The resulting Weyl integral is commonly encountered in microwave integrated circuit analysis and electromagnetic radiation over a stratified medium; as in the case for Sommerfeld integral, it is numerically evaluated. As a result, it is used in calculation of Green's functions for method of moments for such geometries. Other uses include the descriptions of dipolar emissions near surfaces in nanophotonics, holographic inverse scattering problems, Green's functions in quantum electrodynamics and acoustic or seismic waves.

== See also ==
- Angular spectrum method
- Fourier optics
- Green's function
- Plane wave expansion
- Sommerfeld identity

== Sources ==
- Aki, Keiiti; Richards, Paul G. (2002). Quantitative Seismology (2 ed.). Sausalito: University Science Books. ISBN 9781891389634.
- Chew, Weng Cho (1990). Waves and Fields in Inhomogeneous Media. New York: Van Nostrand Reinhold. ISBN 9780780347496.
- Kinayman, Noyan; Aksun, M. I. (2005). Modern Microwave Circuits. Norwood: Artech House. ISBN 9781844073832.
- Novotny, Lukas; Hecht, Bert (2012). Principles of Nano-Optics. Norwood: Cambridge University Press. ISBN 9780511794193.
