= Wavefront curvature sensor =

A wavefront curvature sensor is a device for measuring the aberrations of an optical wavefront. Like a Shack–Hartmann wavefront sensor it uses an array of small lenses (or lenslets) to focus the wavefront into an array of spots. Unlike the Shack-Hartmann, which measures the position of the spots, the curvature sensor measures the intensity on either side of the focal plane. If a wavefront has a phase curvature, it will alter the position of the focal spot along the axis of the beam, thus by measuring the relative intensities in two places the curvature can be deduced.

== See also ==
- Adaptive optics
- Wavefront sensor

== Sources ==
- Roddier, François (1988). "Curvature sensing and compensation: a new concept in adaptive optics". Applied Optics. 27 (7): 1223–1225. Bibcode:1988ApOpt..27.1223R. doi:10.1364/AO.27.001223. PMID 20531543.
- Roddier, François; Roddier, Claude (March 1988). Ulrich, M. H. (ed.). "Curvature Sensing and Compensation: A New Concept in Adaptive Optics". Very Large Telescopes and Their Instrumentation. European Southern Observatory Conference and Workshop Proceedings. 30 (7): 1223–5. Bibcode:1988ESOC...30..667R. doi:10.1364/AO.27.001223. PMID 20531543.
