= Dyakonova =

Dyakonova (masculine: Dyakonov) is a Russian surname. Notable people with the surname include:

- Nina Dyakonova (1915–2013), Russian researcher, professor
- Tatyana Dyakonova (born 1970), Russian politician
- Xenia Dyakonova (born 1965), Russian poet and translator
