= Jacobi–Anger expansion =

Expansion of exponentials of trigonometric functions in the basis of their harmonics

In mathematics, the Jacobi–Anger expansion (or Jacobi–Anger identity) is an expansion of exponentials of trigonometric functions in the basis of their harmonics. It is useful in physics (for example, to convert between plane waves and cylindrical waves), and in signal processing (to describe FM signals). This identity is named after the 19th-century mathematicians Carl Jacobi and Carl Theodor Anger.

The most general identity is given by:

$$e^{i z \cos \theta} \equiv \sum_{n=-\infty}^{\infty} i^n\, J_n(z)\, e^{i n \theta},$$

where $J_n(z)$ is the $n$-th Bessel function of the first kind and $i$ is the imaginary unit, $i^2=-1.$ Substituting $\theta$ by $\theta-\frac{\pi}{2}$, we also get:

$$e^{i z \sin \theta} \equiv \sum_{n=-\infty}^{\infty}       J_n(z)\, e^{i n \theta}.$$

Using the relation $J_{-n}(z) = (-1)^n\, J_{n}(z),$ valid for integer $n$, the expansion becomes:

$$e^{i z \cos \theta} \equiv J_0(z)\, +\, 2\, \sum_{n=1}^{\infty}\, i^n\, J_n(z)\, \cos\, (n \theta).$$

== Real-valued expressions ==
The following real-valued variations are often useful as well:

$$\begin{align}
\cos(z \cos \theta) &\equiv J_0(z)+2 \sum_{n=1}^{\infty}(-1)^n J_{2n}(z) \cos(2n \theta),
\\
\sin(z \cos \theta) &\equiv -2 \sum_{n=1}^{\infty}(-1)^n J_{2n-1}(z) \cos\left[\left(2n-1\right) \theta\right],
\\
\cos(z \sin \theta) &\equiv J_0(z)+2 \sum_{n=1}^{\infty} J_{2n}(z) \cos(2n \theta),
\\
\sin(z \sin \theta) &\equiv 2 \sum_{ n=1 }^{\infty} J_{2n-1}(z) \sin\left[\left(2n-1\right) \theta\right].
\end{align}$$

== See also ==
- Plane wave expansion
