= Wave vector =

Vector describing a wave; often its propagation direction

In physics, a wave vector (or wavevector) is a vector used in describing a wave, with a typical unit being cycle per metre. It has a magnitude and direction. Its magnitude is the wavenumber of the wave (inversely proportional to the wavelength), and its direction is perpendicular to the wavefront. In isotropic media, this is also the direction of wave propagation.

A closely related vector is the angular wave vector (or angular wavevector), with a typical unit being radian per metre. The wave vector and angular wave vector are related by a fixed constant of proportionality, 2π radians per cycle.

It is common in several fields of physics to refer to the angular wave vector simply as the wave vector, in contrast to, for example, crystallography. It is also common to use the symbol k for whichever is in use.

In the context of special relativity, a wave four-vector can be defined, combining the (angular) wave vector and (angular) frequency.

== Definition ==
Wavelength of a sine wave, λ, can be measured between any two consecutive points with the same phase, such as between adjacent crests, or troughs, or adjacent zero crossings with the same direction of transit, as shown.

The terms wave vector and angular wave vector have distinct meanings. Here, the wave vector is denoted by $\tilde{\boldsymbol{\nu}}$ and the wavenumber by $\tilde{\nu} = \left| \tilde{\boldsymbol{\nu}} \right|$. The angular wave vector is denoted by k and the angular wavenumber by k = |k|. These are related by $\mathbf k = 2\pi \tilde{\boldsymbol{\nu}}$.

A sinusoidal traveling wave follows the equation

$$\psi(\mathbf{r},t) = A \cos (\mathbf{k} \cdot \mathbf{r} - \omega t + \varphi) ,$$

where:

- r is position,
- t is time,
- ψ is a function of r and t describing the disturbance describing the wave (for example, for an ocean wave, ψ would be the excess height of the water, or for a sound wave, ψ would be the excess air pressure).
- A is the amplitude of the wave (the peak magnitude of the oscillation),
- φ is a phase offset,
- ω is the (temporal) angular frequency of the wave, describing how many radians it traverses per unit of time, and related to the period T by the equation $\omega= \tfrac{2\pi}{T},$
- k is the angular wave vector of the wave, describing how many radians it traverses per unit of distance, and related to the wavelength by the equation $|\mathbf{k}|= \tfrac{2\pi}{\lambda}.$

The equivalent equation using the wave vector and frequency is

$$\psi \left( \mathbf{r}, t \right) = A \cos \left(2\pi \left( \tilde{\boldsymbol{\nu}} \cdot {\mathbf r} - f t \right) + \varphi \right) ,$$

where:

- $f$ is the frequency
- $\tilde{\boldsymbol{\nu}}$ is the wave vector

== Direction of the wave vector ==
The direction in which the wave vector points must be distinguished from the "direction of wave propagation". The "direction of wave propagation" is the direction of a wave's energy flow, and the direction that a small wave packet will move, i.e. the direction of the group velocity. For light waves in vacuum, this is also the direction of the Poynting vector. On the other hand, the wave vector points in the direction of phase velocity. In other words, the wave vector points in the normal direction to the surfaces of constant phase, also called wavefronts.

In a lossless isotropic medium such as air, any gas, any liquid, amorphous solids (such as glass), and cubic crystals, the direction of the wavevector is the same as the direction of wave propagation. If the medium is anisotropic, the wave vector in general points in directions other than that of the wave propagation. The wave vector is always perpendicular to surfaces of constant phase.

For example, when a wave travels through an anisotropic medium, such as light waves through an asymmetric crystal or sound waves through a sedimentary rock, the wave vector may not point exactly in the direction of wave propagation.

== In solid-state physics ==
In solid-state physics, the "wavevector" (also called k-vector) of an electron or hole in a crystal is the wavevector of its quantum-mechanical wavefunction. These electron waves are not ordinary sinusoidal waves, but they do have a kind of envelope function which is sinusoidal, and the wavevector is defined via that envelope wave, usually using the "physics definition". See Bloch's theorem for further details.

== In special relativity ==
A moving wave surface in special relativity may be regarded as a hypersurface (a 3D subspace) in spacetime, formed by all the events passed by the wave surface. A wavetrain (denoted by some variable X) can be regarded as a one-parameter family of such hypersurfaces in spacetime. This variable X is a scalar function of position in spacetime. The derivative of this scalar is a vector that characterizes the wave, the four-wavevector.

The four-wavevector is a wave four-vector that is defined, in Minkowski coordinates, as:

$$K^\mu = \left(\frac{\omega}{c}, \vec{k}\right) = \left(\frac{\omega}{c}, \frac{\omega}{v_p}\hat{n}\right) = \left(\frac{2 \pi}{cT}, \frac{2 \pi \hat{n}}{\lambda}\right) \,$$

where the angular frequency $\tfrac{\omega}{c}$ is the temporal component, and the wavenumber vector $\vec{k}$ is the spatial component.

Alternately, the wavenumber k can be written as the angular frequency ω divided by the phase-velocity v_{p}, or in terms of inverse period T and inverse wavelength λ.

When written out explicitly its contravariant and covariant forms are:

$$\begin{align}
K^\mu &= \left(\frac{\omega}{c}, k_x, k_y, k_z \right)\, \\[4pt]
K_\mu &= \left(\frac{\omega}{c}, -k_x, -k_y, -k_z \right)
\end{align}$$

In general, the Lorentz scalar magnitude of the wave four-vector is:

$$K^\mu K_\mu = \left(\frac{\omega}{c}\right)^2 - k_x^2 - k_y^2 - k_z^2 = \left(\frac{\omega_o}{c}\right)^2 = \left(\frac{m_o c}{\hbar}\right)^2$$

The four-wavevector is null for massless (photonic) particles, where the rest mass $m_o = 0$

An example of a null four-wavevector would be a beam of coherent, monochromatic light, which has phase-velocity $v_p = c$

$K^\mu = \left(\frac{\omega}{c}, \vec{k}\right) = \left(\frac{\omega}{c}, \frac{\omega}{c}\hat{n}\right) = \frac{\omega}{c}\left(1, \hat{n}\right) \,$ {for light-like/null}

which would have the following relation between the frequency and the magnitude of the spatial part of the four-wavevector:

$K^\mu K_\mu = \left(\frac{\omega}{c}\right)^2 - k_x^2 - k_y^2 - k_z^2 = 0$ {for light-like/null}

The four-wavevector is related to the four-momentum as follows:

$$P^\mu = \left(\frac{E}{c}, \vec{p}\right) = \hbar K^\mu = \hbar\left(\frac{\omega}{c}, \vec{k}\right)$$

The four-wavevector is related to the four-frequency as follows:

$$K^\mu = \left(\frac{\omega}{c}, \vec{k}\right) = \left(\frac{2 \pi}{c}\right)N^\mu = \left(\frac{2 \pi}{c}\right)\left(\nu, \nu \vec{n}\right)$$

The four-wavevector is related to the four-velocity as follows:

$$K^\mu = \left(\frac{\omega}{c}, \vec{k}\right) = \left(\frac{\omega_o}{c^2}\right)U^\mu = \left(\frac{\omega_o}{c^2}\right) \gamma \left(c, \vec{u}\right)$$

=== Lorentz transformation ===
Taking the Lorentz transformation of the four-wavevector is one way to derive the relativistic Doppler effect. The Lorentz matrix is defined as

$$\Lambda = \begin{pmatrix}
\gamma & -\beta \gamma & \ 0 \ & \ 0 \ \\
-\beta \gamma &        \gamma & 0     & 0 \\
0 &             0 & 1     & 0 \\
0 &             0 & 0     & 1
\end{pmatrix}$$

In the situation where light is being emitted by a fast moving source and one would like to know the frequency of light detected in an earth (lab) frame, we would apply the Lorentz transformation as follows. Note that the source is in a frame S^{s} and earth is in the observing frame, S^{obs}. Applying the Lorentz transformation to the wave vector

$$k^{\mu}_s = \Lambda^\mu_\nu k^\nu_{\mathrm{obs}}$$

and choosing just to look at the $\mu = 0$ component results in

$$\begin{align}
k^{0}_s &= \Lambda^0_0 k^0_{\mathrm{obs}} + \Lambda^0_1 k^1_{\mathrm{obs}} + \Lambda^0_2 k^2_{\mathrm{obs}} + \Lambda^0_3 k^3_{\mathrm{obs}} \\[3pt]
\frac{\omega_s}{c} &= \gamma \frac{\omega_{\mathrm{obs}}}{c} - \beta \gamma k^1_{\mathrm{obs}} \\
&= \gamma \frac{\omega_{\mathrm{obs}}}{c} - \beta \gamma \frac{\omega_{\mathrm{obs}}}{c} \cos \theta.
\end{align}$$

where $\cos \theta$ is the direction cosine of $k^1$ with respect to $k^0, k^1 = k^0 \cos \theta.$

So

$\frac{\omega_{\mathrm{obs}}}{\omega_s} = \frac{1}{\gamma (1 - \beta \cos \theta)}$

==== Source moving away (redshift) ====
As an example, to apply this to a situation where the source is moving directly away from the observer ($\theta=\pi$), this becomes:

$$\frac{\omega_{\mathrm{obs}}}{\omega_s} = \frac{1}{\gamma (1 + \beta)} = \frac{\sqrt{1-\beta^2}}{1+\beta} = \frac{\sqrt{(1+\beta)(1-\beta)}}{1+\beta} = \frac{\sqrt{1-\beta}}{\sqrt{1+\beta}}$$

==== Source moving towards (blueshift) ====
To apply this to a situation where the source is moving straight towards the observer (θ = 0), this becomes:

$$\frac{\omega_{\mathrm{obs}}}{\omega_s} = \frac{1}{\gamma (1 - \beta)} = \frac{\sqrt{1-\beta^2}}{1-\beta} = \frac{\sqrt{(1+\beta)(1-\beta)}}{1-\beta} = \frac{\sqrt{1+\beta}}{\sqrt{1-\beta}}$$

==== Source moving tangentially (transverse Doppler effect) ====
To apply this to a situation where the source is moving transversely with respect to the observer (θ = π/2), this becomes:

$$\frac{\omega_{\mathrm{obs}}}{\omega_s} = \frac{1}{\gamma (1 - 0)} = \frac{1}{\gamma}$$

== See also ==
- Plane-wave expansion
- Plane of incidence
