= Mikhail Dyakonov =

Physicist

- Born: April 29, 1940 (age 86); Leningrad, USSR
- Known for: Dyakonov–Perel spin relaxation mechanism Dyakonov–Shur plasma wave instability Dyakonov–Voigt wave Dyakonov surface waves
- Parents: Igor Diakonoff (father); Nina Dyakonova (mother)
- Relatives: Dmitry Dyakonov (brother); Yakov Magaziner (grandfather)
- Scientific career
- Institutions: Laboratoire Charles Coulomb (L2C), Université Montpellier

Mikhail (Michel) Dyakonov (born 1940 in Leningrad) is a Russian professor of physics at Laboratoire Charles Coulomb (L2C), Université Montpellier, CNRS in France.

== Career ==
His name is connected with several physical phenomena: Dyakonov–Perel spin relaxation mechanism, Dyakonov–Shur plasma wave instability. In 1971, together with Vladimir Perel he predicted the spin Hall effect, which has become a field of intense studies.

He theoretically predicted a new class of surface electromagnetic waves, now called Dyakonov surface waves (DSWs) in 1988. Unlike other types of acoustic and electromagnetic surface waves, the DSW's existence is due to the difference in symmetry of materials forming the interface. These waves are important at the interface of a biaxial anisotropic dielectric with an isotropic medium, metamaterials and they have also found use in terahertz applications.

== Awards ==
Professor Dyakonov is a recipient of the State prize (USSR) in physics for theoretical work on spin dynamics (1976), the Frenkel prize of the St. Petersburg Physical Society for theory of streamer discharge (1992), the Ioffe prize of the Russian Academy of Sciences for the theory of hot luminescence (1993), Beller Lectureship Award from the American Physical Society (2009), and the Grand prize from the French Physical Society (2009).

== Critique of quantum computing ==
Dyakonov is also well known for his critique of implementations of quantum computers. He argues that practical quantum computers are not likely to be implemented. He says: "There is a tremendous gap between the rudimentary but very hard experiments that have been carried out with a few qubits and the extremely developed quantum-computing theory, which relies on manipulating thousands to millions of qubits to calculate anything useful. That gap is not likely to be closed anytime soon."
