= Rectilinear propagation =

Tendency of light to travel in a straight line

Rectilinear propagation describes the tendency of electromagnetic waves (light) to travel in a straight line. Light does not deviate when travelling through a homogeneous medium, which has the same refractive index throughout; otherwise, light experiences refraction. Even though a wave front may be bent, (e.g. the waves created by a rock hitting a pond) the individual rays are moving in straight lines. Rectilinear propagation was discovered by Pierre de Fermat.

Rectilinear propagation is only an approximation. The rectilinear approximation is only valid for short distances, in reality light is a wave and have a tendency to spread out over time. The distances for which the approximation is valid depends on the wavelength and the setting being considered. For everyday usages, it remains valid as long as the refractive index in the medium is constant.

The more general theory for how light behaves is described by Maxwell's equations.

== Proof ==
Take three cardboard A, B and C, of the same size. Make a pin hole at the centre of each of three cardboard. Place the cardboard in the upright position, such that the holes in A, B and C are in the same straight line, in the order. Place a luminous source like a candle near the cardboard A and look through the hole in the cardboard C. We can see the candle flame. This implies that light rays travel along a straight line ABC, and hence, candle flame is visible. When one of the cardboard is slightly displaced, candle light would not be visible. It means that the light emitted by the candle is unable to bend and reach observers eye. This proves that light travels along a straight path, as well proving the rectilinear propagation of light.

== See also ==
- Collimated beam
- Diffraction
- Plane wave
