= Pyramid wavefront sensor =

Type of wavefront sensor

A pyramid wavefront sensor is a type of wavefront sensor. It measures the optical aberrations of an optical wavefront. This wavefront sensor uses a pyramidal prism with a large apex angle to split the beam into multiple parts at the geometric focus of a lens. A four-faceted prism, with its tip centered at the peak of the point spread function, will generate four identical pupil images in the absence of optical aberrations. In the presence of optical aberrations, the intensity distribution among the pupils will change. The local wavefront gradients can be obtained by recording the distribution of intensity in the pupil images. The wavefront aberrations can be evaluated from the estimated wavefront gradients.

It has potential applications in astronomy and ophthalmology.

== Modulation ==
The prism is often modulated (mechanically moved in a circle/square) for averaging purposes and to make sure that the ray spends an equal fraction of the total time on every face of the pyramidal prism. This makes the wavefront sensor slightly inconvenient to use due to the need for mechanically moving parts – either the prism or the beam is modulated. Using a light diffusing plate, mechanically moving parts can be eliminated. Alternatively, it has been shown that the need for mechanically moving parts can be overcome in a digital pyramid wavefront sensor with the spatial light modulator.
