= Monochromatic radiation =

Electromagnetic radiation with a single constant frequency

In physics, monochromatic radiation is radiation with a single constant frequency or wavelength. For electromagnetic radiation, when that frequency is part of the visible spectrum (or near it) the term monochromatic light is often used. Monochromatic light is perceived by the human eye as a spectral color.

When monochromatic radiation propagates through vacuum or a homogeneous transparent medium, it remains with a single constant frequency and wavelength; otherwise, it suffers a change in wavelength (the frequency not changed unless there is a nonlinear interaction) and refraction.

== Practical monochromaticity ==
No radiation can be totally monochromatic, since that would require a wave of infinite duration as a consequence of the Fourier transform's localization property (cf. spectral coherence). In practice, "monochromatic" radiation — even from lasers or spectral lines — always consists of components with a range of frequencies of non-zero width.

== Generation ==
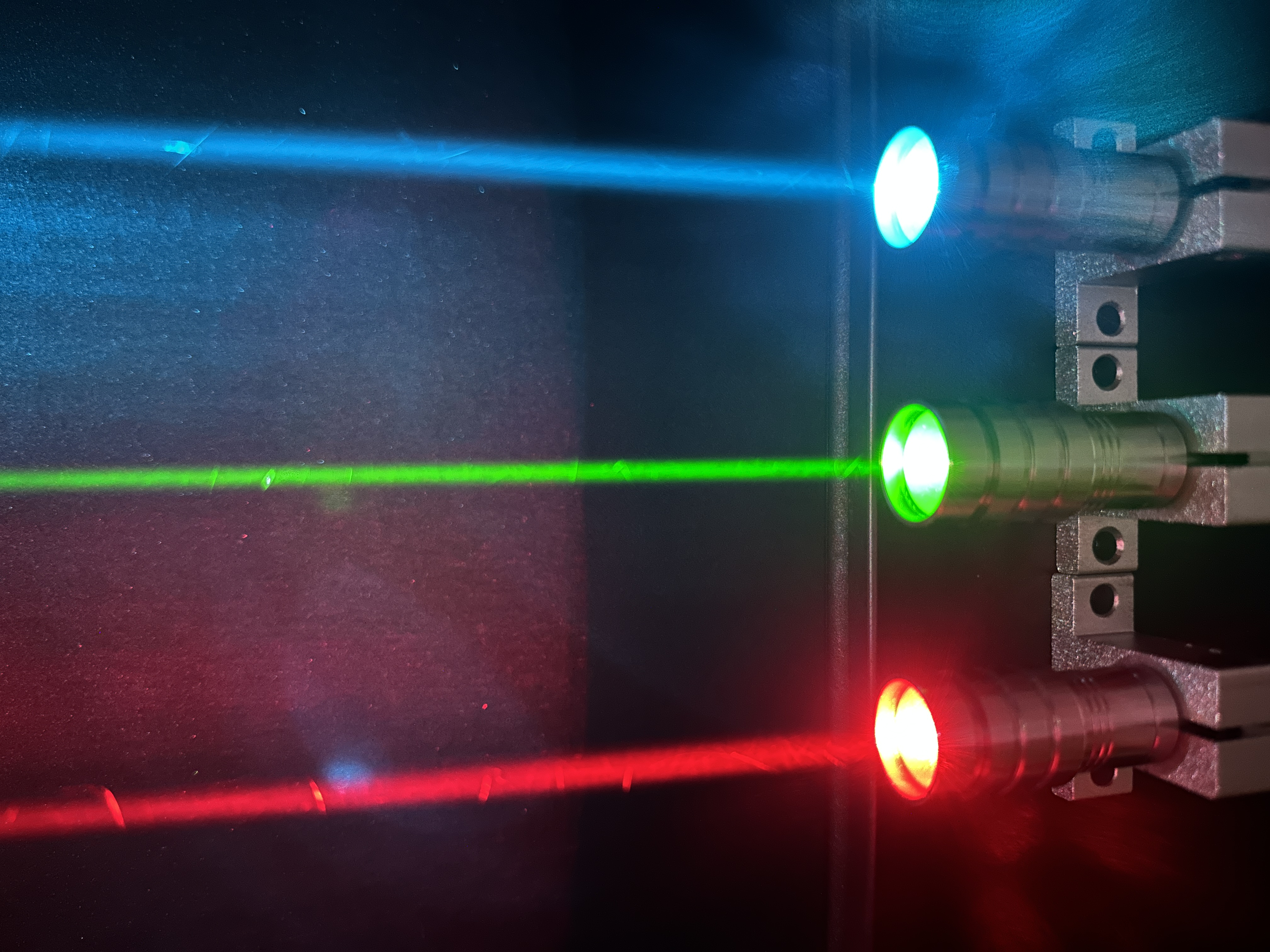
Red Green Blue lasers

Monochromatic radiation can be produced by a number of methods. Isaac Newton observed that a beam of light from the sun could be spread out by refraction into a fan of light with varying colors; and that if a beam of any particular color was isolated from that fan, it behaved as "pure" light that could not be decomposed further.

When atoms of a chemical element in gaseous state are subjected to an electric current, to suitable radiation, or to high enough temperature, they emit a light spectrum with a set of discrete spectral lines (monochromatic components), that are characteristic of the element. This phenomenon is the basis of the science of spectroscopy, and is exploited in fluorescent lamps and the so-called neon signs.

A laser is a device that generates monochromatic and coherent radiation through a process of stimulated emission.

Nearly monochromatic gravitational waves can be generated by spinning non-spherical neutron stars or binaries a long time before merger.

== Properties and uses ==
When monochromatic radiation is made to interfere with itself, the result can be visible and stable interference fringes that can be used to measure very small distances, or large distances with very high accuracy. The current definition of the metre is based on this technique.

In the technique of spectroscopic analysis, a material sample is exposed to monochromatic radiation, and the amount that is absorbed is measured. The graph of absorption as a function of the radiation's frequency is often characteristic of the material's composition. This technique can use radiation ranging from the microwaves, as in rotational spectroscopy, to gamma rays, as in Mössbauer spectroscopy.

== See also ==
- Wave
- Acoustics
- Optics
- Monochromator
- Interferometer
- Diffraction grating
- Dichroic filter
- Monochromatic plane wave
- Newton rings
