= Lenslet =

A lenslet is a small lens. The fact that distinguishes it from a small lens is that it is part of a lenslet array. A lenslet array consists of a set of lenslets in the same plane. Each lenslet normally has the same focal length.

Lenslets have many uses. One of the key applications for lenslets is in integral imaging and light field displays.

Lenslets are commonly found in Shack–Hartmann wavefront sensors and beam homogenization optics for projection systems.
