= Igor M. Diakonoff =

Russian historian and linguist (1915–1999)

- И́горь М. Дья́конов
- Born: Igor Mikhailovich Diakonoff; 12 January 1915; Petrograd, Russian Empire
- Died: 2 May 1999 (aged 84); Saint Petersburg, Russia
- Known for: Contributions to the study of the Ancient Near East and its languages

Academic background
- Education: Saint Petersburg State University

Academic work
- Institutions: Oriental Institute, Saint Petersburg branch
- Main interests: Ancient Near East and its languages

Igor Mikhailovich Diakonoff (occasionally spelled Diakonov, Russian: И́горь Миха́йлович Дья́конов; 12 January 1915 – 2 May 1999) was a Russian historian, linguist, and translator and a renowned expert on the Ancient Near East and its languages. His brothers were also distinguished historians.

== Life and career ==
Diakonoff was brought up in Norway. He graduated from Leningrad State University (now Saint Petersburg State University) in 1938. In the same year he joined the staff of the Hermitage Museum in Leningrad (now Saint Petersburg). In 1949, he published a comprehensive study of Assyria, followed in 1956 by a monograph on Media. Later on, he teamed up with the linguist Sergei Starostin to produce authoritative studies of the Caucasian, Afroasiatic, and Hurro-Urartian languages.

Diakonoff was honored in 2003 with a festschrift volume published in his memory, edited by Lionel Bender, Gábor Takács, and David Appleyard. In addition to articles on Afro-Asiatic languages, it contains a five-page list of his publications compiled by Takács.

== Family ==
Diakonoff's family members are known for their contributions to various fields of knowledge, both sciences and humanities. His wife and two sons became well-known researchers and achieved ranks of full professors.

=== Brother's family ===
- Igor's brother Mikhail Mikhailovich Diakonoff was an authority in Iranian studies.
- Mikhail Diakonoff's daughter Elena Diakonova is a translator from Old and Modern Japanese.

=== Wives ===
Igor's first wife Nina Dyakonova (1915–2013) was a historian and critic of English literature, with a special interest in English Romantic poetry of the early 19th century (Keats, Byron, Shelley) and its reception in European and Russian literature. A student of Professors Viktor Zhirmunsky and Mikhail Alexeyev, she was a professor at her alma mater Saint Petersburg State University, and later, teacher-training Herzen University.

His second wife, Ninel Yankovskaya (1925–2005), was a historian, assyriologist in the State Hermitage Museum.

=== Sons ===
Igor's sons became prominent physicists.

- Mikhail Dyakonov (born 1940) – Doctor of Physical and Mathematical Sciences, Chief Researcher\Honorary Fellow of the St. Petersburg Abram Ioffe Physicotechnical Institute of the Russian Academy of Sciences, and after that, since 1998 professor at the University of Montpellier, laureate of the State Prize of the USSR;
- Dmitry Dyakonov (1949–2012) – Doctor of Physics and Mathematics, Deputy Head of the Sector of Theoretical Physics of High Energies, Professor B. P. Konstantinov St. Petersburg Nuclear Physics Institute of the Russian Academy of Sciences.

== Selected bibliography ==
- 1965. Semito-Hamitic Languages. Moscow: Nauka.
- 1984. Co-authored with V. P. Neroznak. Phrygian. Delmar, New York: Caravan Books.
- 1985. "On the original home of the speakers of Indo-European". Journal of Indo-European Studies 13, pp. 92–174.
- 1986. Co-authored with Sergei A. Starostin. Hurro-Urartian as an Eastern Caucasian Language. Munich: R. Kitzinger.
- 1988. Afrasian Languages. Moscow: Nauka.
- 1992. Co-authored with Olga Stolbova and Alexander Militarev. Proto-Afrasian and Old Akkadian: A Study in Historical Phonetics. Princeton: Institute of Semitic Studies.
- 1995. Archaic Myths of the Orient and the Occident. Acta universitatis gothoburgensis.
- 1999. The Paths of History. Cambridge: Cambridge University Press.

== Sources ==
- Dandamayev, M.A., Mogens T. Larsen, and J. Nicholas Postgate (editors). 1982. Societies and Languages of the Ancient Near East: Studies in Honour of I.M. Diakonoff. Warminster: Aris and Philipps.
- Bender, M. Lionel and Gábor Takács (editors). 2003. Selected Comparative-Historical Afrasian Linguistic Studies in Memory of Igor M. Diakonoff. Munich: Lincom Europa.
