= Angular spectrum method =

Technique for modeling the propagation of a wave field

The angular spectrum method is a technique for modeling the propagation of a wave field. This technique involves expanding a complex wave field into a summation of infinite number of plane waves of the same frequency and different directions. Its mathematical origins lie in the field of Fourier optics but it has been applied extensively in the field of ultrasound. The technique can predict an acoustic pressure field distribution over a plane, based upon knowledge of the pressure field distribution at a parallel plane. Predictions in both the forward and backward propagation directions are possible.

Modeling the diffraction of a CW (continuous wave), monochromatic (single frequency) field involves the following steps:

1. Sampling the complex (real and imaginary) components of a pressure field over a grid of points lying in a cross-sectional plane within the field.
2. Taking the 2D-FFT (two dimensional Fourier transform) of the pressure field - this will decompose the field into a 2D "angular spectrum" of component plane waves each traveling in a unique direction.
3. Multiplying each point in the 2D-FFT by a propagation term which accounts for the phase change that each plane wave will undergo on its journey to the prediction plane.
4. Taking the 2D-IFFT (two dimensional inverse Fourier transform) of the resulting data set to yield the field over the prediction plane.

In addition to predicting the effects of diffraction, the model has been extended to apply to non-monochromatic cases (acoustic pulses) and to include the effects of attenuation, refraction, and dispersion. Several researchers have also extended the model to include the nonlinear effects of finite amplitude acoustic propagation (propagation in cases where sound speed is not constant but is dependent upon the instantaneous acoustic pressure).

Backward propagation predictions can be used to analyze the surface vibration patterns of acoustic radiators such as ultrasonic transducers. Forward propagation can be used to predict the influence of inhomogeneous, nonlinear media on acoustic transducer performance.

== See also ==
- Wave field synthesis
