= Shack–Hartmann wavefront sensor =

Type of optical instrument

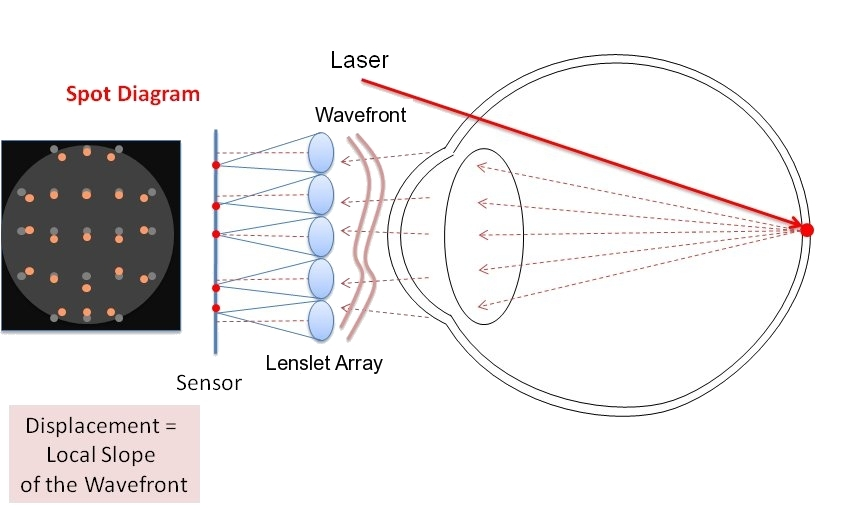
Shack–Hartmann system in clinical optics: Laser creates a virtual light source in the retina. The lenslet array creates spots in the sensor according to the wavefront coming out of the eye.

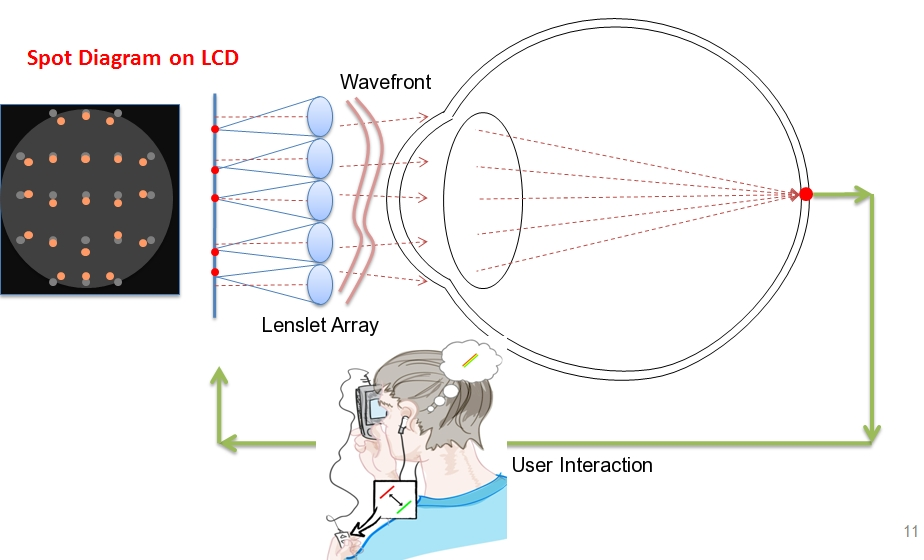
Inverse of the Shack–Hartmann system in clinical optics: A set of patterns is displayed on the screen, the user aligns/overlaps them in a single image pressing buttons.

A schematic illustration of a SHWFS.

Operations of a single lenslet in a SHWFS.

A Shack–Hartmann (or Hartmann–Shack) wavefront sensor (SHWFS) is an optical detector used for measuring electromagnetic wavefronts. It is a wavefront sensor commonly used in adaptive optics systems and as a non-interferometric metrology tool. It consists of an array of lenses (called lenslets) of the same focal length. Each is focused onto a photon sensor (typically a CCD array or CMOS array or quad-cell). The SHWFS samples wavefronts using lenslet arrays to estimate centroids of the image formed referred to as a spot field. If the sensor is placed at the geometric focal plane of the lenslet, and is uniformly illuminated, then, the integrated gradient of the wavefront across the lenslet is proportional to the displacement of the centroid. Wavefronts that contain distortion are detected by the displacement of the spots on the spot field allowing for a complete reconstruction of the wavefront. SHWFS is unable to detect discontinuous steps in the wavefront since it is measuring distortion in a wavefront.

== History ==
The fundamental principle seems to be documented even before Huygens by the Jesuit philosopher, Christopher Scheiner, in Austria. Scheiner's disk was a simple test using a disk with two holes in it to observe defocus in the eyes. A subject with poor vision would view a candle from a far distant and then move toward it. Due to defocus the subject would see two candles and if those two candles merged into one while decreasing the distance the subject was near-sighted. This basic concept was later improved in 1904 by Johannes Franz Hartmann. He created a mask with an array of holes. This mask was a means of tracing individual rays of light through the optical system of a large telescope, thereby testing the quality of the image. In the late 1960s, Roland Shack and Ben Platt modified the Hartmann screen by replacing the apertures in an opaque screen by an array of lenslets.

== Applications ==
=== Astronomy ===
SHWFS are used in astronomy to for high-resolution imaging. A major issue with astronomical imaging is the atmosphere surrounding the Earth. The atmosphere presents a turbulence within telescopes causing the photon starved system to lose image quality. The SHWFS allows systems to measure and correct this turbulence. Additionally, telescopes are complex optical systems and it is critical that the light entering the system will not contain aberrations due to the optics. The SHWFS allows systems to be calibrated in real time to measure base wavefronts until a certain degree of precision is guaranteed from the equipment.

=== Ophthalmology ===
SHWFS are used in medicine to characterize eyes for corneal treatment of complex refractive errors. Recently, Pamplona et al. developed and patented an inverse of the Shack–Hartmann system to measure one's eye lens aberrations. While Shack–Hartmann sensors measure the localized slope of the wavefront error using spot displacement in the sensor plane, Pamplona et al. replace the sensor plane with a high resolution visual display (e.g. a mobile phone screen) that displays spots that the user views through a lenslet array. The user then manually shifts the displayed spots (i.e. the generated wavefront) until the spots align. The magnitude of this shift provides data to estimate the first-order parameters such as radius of curvature and hence error due to defocus and spherical aberration. Methods to reliably measure the aberrations within the human eye are rapidly evolving. SHWFS are a crucial tool to accurately measure wavefronts that contain information from the eyes. Work is being done to correct ocular aberrations using Laser in situ Keratomileusis (LASIK), Photorefractive keratectomy (PRK), and ophthalmic lenses. These breakthroughs all use the SHWFS as their basis of detection of aberrations in order to implement the correct changes.

== See also ==
- Optical Telescope Element (used this sensor in development of the James Webb Space Telescope)
