= Dyakonov surface wave =

Dyakonov surface waves (DSWs) are surface electromagnetic waves that travel along the interface in between an isotropic and an uniaxial-birefringent medium. They were theoretically predicted in 1988 by the Russian physicist Mikhail Dyakonov. Unlike other types of acoustic and electromagnetic surface waves, the DSW's existence is due to the difference in symmetry of materials forming the interface. He considered the interface between an isotropic transmitting medium and an anisotropic uniaxial crystal, and showed that under certain conditions waves localized at the interface should exist. Later, similar waves were predicted to exist at the interface between two identical uniaxial crystals with different orientations. The previously known electromagnetic surface waves, surface plasmons and surface plasmon polaritons, exist under the condition that the permittivity of one of the materials forming the interface is negative, while the other one is positive (for example, this is the case for the air/metal interface below the plasma frequency). In contrast, the DSW can propagate when both materials are transparent; hence they are virtually lossless, which is their most fascinating property.

In recent years, the significance and potential of the DSW have attracted the attention of many researchers: a change of the constitutive properties of one or both of the two partnering materials – due to, say, infiltration by any chemical or biological agent – could measurably change the characteristics of the wave. Consequently, numerous potential applications are envisaged, including devices for integrated optics, chemical and biological surface sensing, etc. However, it is not easy to satisfy the necessary conditions for the DSW, and because of this the first proof-of-principle experimental observation of DSW was reported only 20 years after the original prediction.

A large number of theoretical work appeared dealing with various aspects of this phenomenon, see the detailed review. In particular, DSW propagation at magnetic interfaces, in left-handed materials, in electro-optical, and chiral materials was studied. Resonant transmission due to DSW in structures using prisms was predicted, and combination and interaction between DSW and surface plasmons (Dyakonov plasmons) was studied and observed.

== Physical properties ==
The simplest configuration considered in Ref. 1 consists of an interface between an isotropic material with permittivity ε and a uniaxial crystal with permittivities ε_{0} and ε_{e} for the ordinary and the extraordinary waves respectively. The crystal C axis is parallel to the interface. For this configuration, the DSW can propagate along the interface within certain angular intervals with respect to the C axis, provided that the condition of ε_{e} > ε > ε_{0} is satisfied. Thus DSW are supported by interfaces with positive birefringent crystals only (ε_{e} > ε_{0}). The angular interval is defined by the parameter

$$\eta = \frac{\epsilon_e}{\epsilon_0} - 1$$.

The angular intervals for the DSW phase and group velocities (Δθ_{ph} and Δθ_{gr}) are different. The phase velocity interval is proportional to η^{2} and even for the most strongly birefringent natural crystals is very narrow Δθ_{ph} ≈ 1° (rutile) and Δθ_{ph} ≈ 4° (calomel). However the physically more important group velocity interval is substantially larger (proportional to η). Calculations give Δθ_{gr} ≈ 7° for rutile, and Δθ_{gr} ≈ 20° for calomel.

== Perspectives ==
A widespread experimental investigation of DSW material systems and evolution of related practical devices has been largely limited by the stringent anisotropy conditions necessary for successful DSW propagation, particularly the high degree of birefringence of at least one of the constituent materials and the limited number of naturally available materials fulfilling this requirement. However, this is about to change in light of novel artificially engineered metamaterials and revolutionary material synthesis techniques.

The extreme sensitivity of DSW to anisotropy, and thereby to stress, along with their low-loss (long-range) character render them particularly attractive for enabling high sensitivity tactile and ultrasonic sensing for next-generation high-speed transduction and read-out technologies. Moreover, the unique directionality of DSW can be used for the steering of optical signals.

== See also ==
- Dyakonov–Voigt wave
- Surface wave
- Leaky mode
