= Plane-wave expansion =

Expressing a plane wave as a combination of spherical waves

In physics, the plane-wave expansion or Rayleigh expansion expresses a plane wave as a linear combination of spherical waves:
$$e^{i \mathbf k \cdot \mathbf r} = \sum_{\ell = 0}^\infty (2 \ell + 1) i^\ell j_\ell(k r) P_\ell(\hat{\mathbf k} \cdot \hat{\mathbf r}),$$
where

- i is the imaginary unit,
- k is a real or complex wave vector of length k,
- r is a position vector of length r,
- j_{ℓ} are spherical Bessel functions,
- P_{ℓ} are Legendre polynomials, and
- the hat ^ denotes the unit vector.

In the special case where k is aligned with the z axis,
$$e^{i k r \cos \theta} = \sum_{\ell = 0}^\infty (2 \ell + 1) i^\ell j_\ell(k r) P_\ell(\cos \theta),$$
where θ is the spherical polar angle of r.

For proof, expand $e^{i k r \cos \theta}$ in Legendre polynomials $P_l(\cos\theta)$, and evaluate the coeffient integrals.

== Expansion in spherical harmonics ==
With the spherical-harmonic addition theorem the equation can be rewritten as
$$e^{i \mathbf{k} \cdot \mathbf{r}} = 4 \pi \sum_{\ell = 0}^\infty \sum_{m = -\ell}^\ell i^\ell j_\ell(k r) Y_\ell^m{}(\hat{\mathbf k}) Y_\ell^{m*}(\hat{\mathbf r}),$$
where

- Y_{ℓ}^{m} are the spherical harmonics and
- the superscript * denotes complex conjugation.

Note that the complex conjugation can be interchanged between the two spherical harmonics due to symmetry.

== Applications ==
The plane wave expansion is applied in

- Acoustics
- Optics
- S-matrix
- Quantum mechanics

== See also ==
- Helmholtz equation
- Plane wave expansion method in computational electromagnetism
- Weyl expansion
