= Dyakonov–Voigt wave =

A triangular prism dispersing white light.

A Dyakonov–Voigt wave (also known as DV wave and Dyakonov–Voigt surface wave) is a distinctive type of surface electromagnetic light wave that results from a particular manipulation of crystals. It was discovered in 2019 by researchers from the University of Edinburgh and Pennsylvania State University and its unique properties were described based on models involving equations developed in the mid-1800s by mathematician and physicist James Clerk Maxwell. Its discoverers found that the wave is produced at the specific interface between natural or synthetic crystals and another material, such as water or oil. Such DV waves were found to travel in a single direction, and decay as they moved away from the interface. Other types of such surface waves, like Dyakonov surface waves (DSWs), travel in multiple directions, and decay more quickly. DV waves decay as "the product of a linear and an exponential function of the distance from the interface in the anisotropic medium," but the fields of the Dyakonov surface waves decay "only exponentially in the anisotropic medium". Research co-leader Tom Mackay noted: "Dyakonov–Voigt waves represent a step forward in our understanding of how light interacts with complex materials, and offer opportunities for a range of technological advancements." Applications of the newly found waves may include biosensor improvements for blood sample screening, and fiber optic circuit developments, to permit a better transfer of data.

This wave is now classified as an exceptional surface wave.

== See also ==
- Dyakonov surface waves
- Maxwell's equations
