= Nina Dyakonova =

Russian researcher and professor

Professor Nina Ya. Dyakonova
- Нина Яковлевна Дьяконова
External image
- Nina Dyakonova on Russian Wikipedia
- Born: Nina Yakovlevna Magaziner; 20 August 1915; Petrograd (Russian Empire)
- Died: 9 December 2013 (aged 98); Saint Petersburg (Russian Federation)
- Other names: Nina Yakovlevna Dyakonova, Nina Yakovlevna Magaziner
- Citizenship: Russian Empire, USSR, Russian Federation
- Education: Saint Peter's School, Saint Petersburg State University
- Known for: contributions to the study of English Romantic poetry (John Keats, Lord Byron et al.) and interactions between European literatures with each other and with Russian literature
- Spouse: Igor M. Diakonoff (m. 1936 - d.1999)
- Children: Mikhail Igorevich Dyakonov (born 1940); Dmitry Igorevich Dyakonov (1949-2012) - Doctor of Physics and Mathematics, Deputy Head of the Sector of Theoretical Physics of High Energies, Professor B. P. Konstantinov St. Petersburg Nuclear Physics Institute of the Russian Academy of Sciences.
- Scientific career
- Fields: English literature
- Workplaces: Saint Petersburg State University, Herzen University
- Theses: «Китс и поэты Возрождения» ("Keats and Renaissance Poets") (Kyshtym, Candidate of Philological Sciences) (1943); "Лондонские романтики и проблемы английского романтизма» ("London Romantics and the Problems of English Romanticism", Leningrad, Doctor of Philological Sciences) (1966)
- Website: perlovnik.livejournal.com

Nina Yakovlevna Dyakonova (also spelled Diakonova; Russian: Нина Яковлевна Дьяконова; born Magaziner; 20 October 1915, Petrograd, Russian Empire - 9 December 2013, St. Petersburg, Russian Federation) was a Russian researcher of 19th century English and European literature, full professor, Doctor of Philology, member of the Board of Directors of the International Byron Society, and member of the editorial board of the Russian academic book series Literaturniye pamyatniki (Literary monuments). She was an authority in the history of English literature (with a special interest in English Romantic poetry (Keats, Byron, Shelley)) and links between European literatures with each other and with Russian literature, especially of the 19th century, following her professor Mikhail P. Alexeyev.

== Biography ==
Born in the family of the famous Soviet lawyer Professor Yakov Mironovich Magaziner (1882–1961) and his wife Lydia Mikhailovna.

In 1937 she graduated from the Leningrad State University, finishing the courses of two sections - linguistic and literary, and was a disciple of Professors Mikhail P. Alexeyev and Viktor M. Zhirmunsky. In 1936 she married the Orientalist scholar Igor M. Dyakonov. In 1943, in the World War II evacuation from besieged Leningrad to a small town of Kyshtym, she defended her Candidate of Sciences thesis «Китс и поэты Возрождения» ("Keats and Renaissance Poets"). Since 1944 she was an assistant professor, then a full professor at the History of Foreign Literatures Department at the Faculty/School of Philology of Leningrad State University. In 1966 she defended her doctoral dissertation "Лондонские романтики и проблемы английского романтизма» ("London Romantics and the Problems of English Romanticism"), dedicated to the works of Hazlitt, Ch.Lamb, Leigh Hunt and other "Londoners." Long-term friendship associated N. Ya. Dyakonova with Ye. G. Etkind and F. A. Vigdorova. Since 1985 she taught at the Leningrad State Pedagogical Institute named after Alexander Herzen (now Alexander Herzen Russian State Pedagogical University).

== Family ==
=== Husband ===
Igor Mikhailovich Dyakonov, Russian historian of the Orient and linguist.

=== Sons ===
- Mikhail Dyakonov (born 1940) - Doctor of Physical and Mathematical Sciences, Chief Researcher\Honorary Fellow of the St. Petersburg Abram Ioffe Physicotechnical Institute of the Russian Academy of Sciences, and after that, since 1998 professor at the University of Montpellier, laureate of the State Prize of the USSR;
- Dmitry Dyakonov (1949–2012) - Doctor of Physics and Mathematics, Deputy Head of the Sector of Theoretical Physics of High Energies, Professor B. P. Konstantinov St. Petersburg Nuclear Physics Institute of the Russian Academy of Sciences.

=== Husband's brother's family ===
- Igor's brother Mikhail Mikhailovich Dyakonoff was an authority in Iranian studies.
- Mikhail Dyakonoff's daughter Elena Dyakonova is a translator from Old and Modern Japanese.

== Work ==
=== Literary scholar ===
The author of significant works on the writing of Shakespeare, Shelley, Byron, Keats, Dickens, Stevenson, Shaw, Huxley.

=== Teacher ===
Dyakonova already joined the teaching profession as an undergraduate student: in 1934 she began to teach English to undergraduates of Oriental studies. Since then, her teaching career never interrupted for a year. Among the students of Dyakonova were dozens of candidates and doctors of science, experienced university teachers and translators of fiction (Galina S. Usova, Galina V. Yakovleva, V.E. Vetlovskaya, I.B. Komarova, Alexandr A. Chameyev, Sergey L. Sukharev, and others).

The last decades of her teaching activity were spent as a full professor at the Department of Foreign Literature of the Philological Faculty of Alexander Herzen Russian State Pedagogical University,

=== Editor ===
N. Ya. Dyakonova edited translations of Byron, Lamb, Keats, Fielding, Radcliffe, De Quincey, Hazlitt, and compiled several editions of English classical literature (Kipling, Huxley, Lawrence). Two books on Byron (Bairon v gody izgnaniya (Byron in the years of exile), 1974, Liricheskaya poeziya Bairona (Byron's Lyrical Poetry), 1975) arose from a long and careful (for more than two years) editing of the translation of the poem Don Juan performed by Tatyana Grigorievna Gnedich .

== Legacy ==
=== Monographs ===
- Джон Голсуорси. — Л.; М.: Искусство, 1960. 132 с. (John Galsworthy. - Leningrad; Moscow: Iskusstvo, 1960. 132 pp.)
- Лондонские романтики и проблемы английского романтизма. — Л.: Изд. ЛГУ, 1970. 232 с. (London romantics and the problems of English romanticism. - Leningrad: Leningrad State University Press, 1970. 232 pp.)
- Китс и его современники. — М.: Наука, 1973. 199 с. (Keats and his contemporaries. - Moscow: Nauka, 1973. 199 pp.)
- Байрон в годы изгнания. — Л.: Художественная литература, 1974. 161 с. (Byron in the years of exile. - Leningrad: Khudozhestvennaia literatura, 1974. 161 pp.)
  - Байрон в годы изгнания / Н. Я. Дьяконова. — Изд. 2-е. — Москва: URSS, 2007. — 189, [2] с. (Byron in the years of exile / N. Ya. Dyakonova. - 2nd. edition - Moscow: URSS, 2007. - 189, [2] pp.) ISBN 978-5-382-00241-5.
- Лирическая поэзия Байрона. — М.: Наука, 1975. 168 с.(Lyrical Poetry of Byron. - Moscow: Nauka, 1975. 168 pp.)
  - Лирическая поэзия Байрона / Н. Я. Дьяконова; отв. ред. М. П. Алексеев. — Изд. 2-е. — Москва: URSS, 2007. — 166, [2] с. ISBN 978-5-382-00343-6 (Lyric Poetry of Byron / N. Ya. Dyakonova; Ed. by M.P. Alekseev. - 2nd ed - Moscow: URSS, 2007. - 166, [2] pp. ISBN 978-5-382-00343-6)
- Английский романтизм: Проблемы эстетики. — М.: Наука, 1978. 208 с. (English Romanticism: Problems of Aesthetics. - Moscow: Nauka, 1978. 208 pp.)
- Стивенсон и английская литература XIX века / Н. Я. Дьяконова. — Л.: Изд-во ЛГУ, 1984. — 192 с. (Stevenson and the English literature of the XIX century / N. Ya. Dyakonova. - Leningrad: Leningrad University Press, 1984. - 192 pp.)
- Shelley / N. Ya. Dyakonova, A.A. Chameyev; Ed. by V.N. Sheinker; Rus. Academy of Sciences. - St. Petersburg: Nauka: St. Petersburg publishing company, 1994. - 220, [3] pp. (Together with A.A. Chameyev).

=== Articles ===
- Творческий труд учёного: (К 75-летию академика Михаила Павловича Алексеева) // Русская литература. — 1971. — No. 2. — С. 213–218. Совместно с Ю. Д. Левиным. (Creative work of the scientist: (To the 75th anniversary of Academician Mikhail Pavlovich Alekseyev) // Russkaya literatura (Russian literature) . - 1971. - No. 2. - pp 213–218. Together with Yu. D. Levin).
- Чарльз Лэм и Элия // Лэм Ч. Очерки Элии. — Л.: Наука, 1979. — С. 181–208. (Charles Lamb and Elia / / Lamb Ch. Essays of Elia. - Leningrad: Nauka, 1979. - pp. 181–208.) [6]
- Джон Китс. Стихи и проза // Китс Джон. Стихотворения. — Л.: Наука, 1986. — С. 286–310. (John Keats. Poems and Prose // Keats, John. Poems. - Leningrad: Nauka, 1986. - pp. 286–310.)
- Томас де Квинси — повествователь, эссеист, критик (1785–1859) // Томас Де Квинси. Исповедь англичанина, любителя опиума. — М.: Наука, 2000. — С. 335–368. — («Литературные памятники».) Thomas De Quincey as a narrator, essayist, critic (1785–1859) // Thomas De Quincey. Confessions of an English Opium-Eater. - Moscow: Nauka, 2000. - pp. 335–368. - (Literary Monuments book series.)
- Из истории английской литературы. Статьи разных лет. — СПб.: Алетейя, 2001. — 192 с. (From the history of English literature. Articles of different years. - St. Petersburg: Aleteya, 2001. - 192 pp.)
- «Литературность» Теккерея // Известия РАН. Серия литературы и языка. — Т. 57, No. 5. — М., 1998. — С. 3–14. ("Literariness" of Thackeray // Izvestiya Rossiyskoy akademii nauk (Bulletin of the Russian Academy of Sciences. Series on literature and language . - Vol. 57, No. 5. - Moscow, 1998. - pp. 3–14.)
- Heine as an Interpreter of Byron. Nina Diakonova. \\ The Byron Journal. Jan. 1994, Num. 22, pp. 63–69.

=== Editing, compiling, commenting ===
- Байрон Дж.Г. Дон Жуан (Byron G.G. Don Juan) / Transl. by T. Gnedich. Moscow, Leningrad. Editing (in conjunction with A.A. Smirnov). Comments. pp. 539–590.
- Дьяконова Н.Я., Амелина Т.А. // Diakonova N.Ya., Amelina T.A. Хрестоматия по английской литературе XIX века // An Anthology of English Literature of the 19-th Century (in English). Изд.2. URSS. 2010. 288 с.

=== Reviews ===
- Жизнь слова (Н. Галь. Слово живое и мёртвое. М.: Книга, 1975.) // Нева. 1976. No. 4. Life of the word (N. Gal. The word alive and dead. Moscow .: Kniga Publishers, 1975.) // Neva. 1976. No.4
- Забвению не подлежит (Е. С. Чернокова. Поэзия Кристины Россетти в контексте эстетики прерафаэлитизма. It is not subject to oblivion (ES Chernokova. The poetry of Christine Rossetti in the context of the aesthetics of Pre-Raphaelism. Kharkov, 2004. 208 pp.) // Neva. 2005. No. 3
- Никто не забыт, ничто не забыто (Nobody is forgotten, nothing is forgotten) (T.G Frumenkova. Мы вышли из блокадных дней. (We came out of the blockade days.) SPb., 2005) // Neva. 2006. No.1

=== Memoirs ===
- Фриде (To Frieda) // Zvezda. 2005. No. 3.
- Минувшие дни (Past days).
- Забытая поэма забытого автора (A forgotten long poem of a forgotten author). // Neva. 2006. No. 3. Together with M. M. Dyakonov.

=== Filmography ===
- «Ломовая лошадь истории» (History's Draught-horse) - a documentary (in Russian). Director: Edgar Bartenev, SevZapKino, St. Petersburg, 2010, 40 minutes, commissioned by the Kultura channel. Project page on the Kultura TV channel website.
- "Леди Нина" (Lady Nina), a documentary. On YouTube.
- Воспоминания Нины Яковлевны Дьяконовой. Часть 1. О предках. (Nina Dyakonova's reminiscences. Part 1. On ancestors). On YouTube.
- Воспоминания Нины Яковлевны Дьяконовой. Часть 2. Становление. (Nina Dyakonova's reminiscences. Part 2. Becoming), On YouTube
- Воспоминания Нины Яковлевны Дьяконовой. Часть 3. Другая эпоха. (Nina Dyakonova's reminiscences. Part 3. A different era), On YouTube

== Links ==
- Article on Dyakonova on the site of the series "Literary monuments"
- "Perlovnik" ("Gems" Collection) of Igor Mikhailovich and Nina Yakovlevna Dyakonov
- I. M. Dyakonov. Book of memories (Rus)
- Page in honour of N. Ya. Dyakonova on the website of the Alexander Herzen Russian Pedagogical University's Philology School Dean's Office
