= Aberrations of the eye =

Form of optical aberration

The eye, like any other optical system, suffers from a number of specific optical aberrations. The optical quality of the eye is limited by optical aberrations, diffraction and scatter. Correction of spherocylindrical refractive errors has been possible for nearly two centuries following Airy's development of methods to measure and correct ocular astigmatism. It has only recently become possible to measure the aberrations of the eye and with the advent of refractive surgery it might be possible to correct certain types of irregular astigmatism.

The appearance of visual complaints such as halos, glare and monocular diplopia after corneal refractive surgery has long been correlated with the induction of optical aberrations. Several mechanisms may explain the increase in the amount of higher-order aberrations with conventional excimer laser refractive procedures: a change in corneal shape toward oblateness or prolateness (after myopic and hyperopic ablations respectively), insufficient optical zone size and imperfect centration. These adverse effects are particularly noticeable when the pupil is large.

== Wavefront approach to aberrations of the eye ==
The flat wavefronts change to spherical wavefronts as they pass through a pinhole

A wavefront is a surface over which an optical disturbance has a constant phase. Rays and wavefronts are two mutually complementary approaches to light propagation. Wavefronts are always normal (perpendicular) to the rays.

For light to converge to a perfect point, the wavefront emerging from the optical system must be a perfect sphere centered on the image point. The distance in micrometers between the actual wavefront and the ideal wavefront is the wavefront aberration, which is the standard method of showing the aberrations of the eye. Therefore, aberrations of the eye are the difference between two surfaces: the ideal and the actual wavefront.

== Aberration of normal eyes ==
In normal population the dominant aberrations are the ordinary second-order spherocylindrical focus errors, which are called refractive errors. Higher order aberrations are a relatively small component, comprising about 10% of the eye's total aberrations. High order aberrations increase with age and mirror symmetry exists between the right and the left eyes.

Several studies have reported a compensation of the aberration of the cornea by the aberration of the crystalline lens. The spherical aberration of the cornea is usually positive whereas the young crystalline lens exhibits a negative spherical aberration. Besides, there is strong evidence of compensation for aberrations between the cornea and intraocular optics in cases of astigmatism (horizontal/vertical) and horizontal coma. The balance of corneal and internal aberrations is a typical example of creating two coupling optical systems.

The accommodative response of the eye results in changes to the lens shape and substantially affects the wavefront aberration pattern. Most eyes show positive spherical aberration when unaccommodated with a trend toward negative spherical aberration on accommodation.

== Low order aberrations ==
Low order aberrations include Myopia (positive defocus), hyperopia (negative defocus), and regular astigmatism. Other lower-order aberrations are non- visually significant aberrations known as first order aberrations, such as prisms and zero-order aberrations (piston). Low order aberrations account for approximately 90% of the overall wave aberration in the eye. In general, the increase in overall wave aberration with pupil size has been reported to increase to approximately the second power of the pupil radius. This is because most wave aberration is due to 2nd order aberrations, which have a square radius dependency.

== High order aberrations ==
Spherical aberration. A perfect lens (top) focuses all incoming rays to a point on the Optical axis. In spherical aberration (Bottom) peripheral rays are focused more tightly than central rays.

There are numerous higher-order aberrations, of which only spherical aberration, coma and trefoil are of clinical interest.

Spherical aberration clinically refers to a fourth-order spherical aberration (generally, spherical aberration may refer to all spherical Zernike polynomials). It results in halos around point images and exacerbates myopia in low light (night myopia). Spherical aberration is commonly increased after myopic LASIK and surface ablation. The effect of spherical aberration increases as the fourth power of the pupil diameter, therefore its effects are minimised in bright lighting conditions as the pupil constricts and fewer peripheral rays enter the eye. Small changes in pupil diameter have a large effect on spherical aberration'

Coma (a third-order aberration) is common in patients with decentred corneal grafts, keratoconus, and decentred laser ablations.

Trefoil (a third-order aberration) produces less degradation in image quality compared with coma of similar RMS magnitude.

== Assessment and quantitative expression of ocular aberrations ==
=== Assessment ===
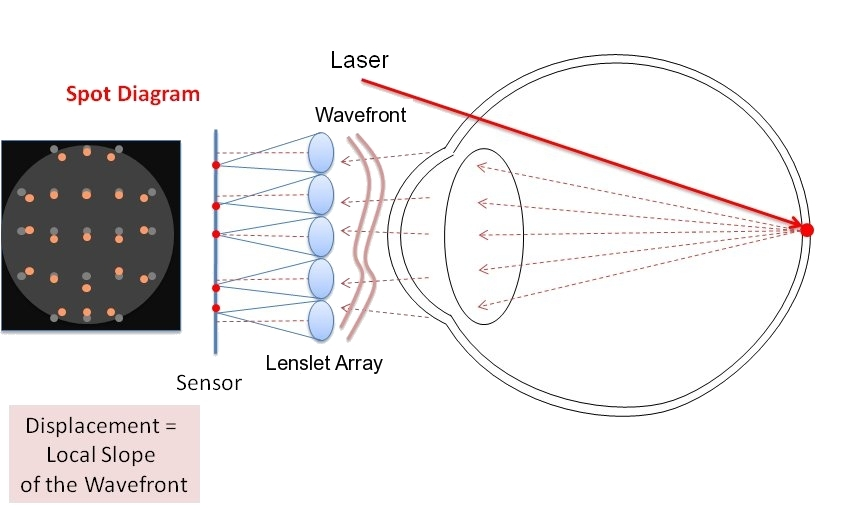
Illustration of Shack-Hartmann system

Many techniques for measuring the eye's aberrations have been described, The most common technique is Shack-Hartmann aberrometry. Other methods include Tscherning systems, ray tracing and Skiascopy methods.

=== Quantitative expression ===
==== RMS ====
Quantitative comparisons between different eyes and conditions are usually made using RMS (root mean square). To measure RMS for each type of aberration involves squaring the difference between the aberration and mean value and averaging it across the pupil area. Different kinds of aberrations may have equal RMS across the pupil but have different effects on vision, therefore, RMS error is unrelated to visual performance. The majority of eyes have total RMS values less than 0.3 μm.

==== Zernike polynomials ====
The most common method of classifying the shapes of aberration maps is to consider each map as the sum of fundamental shapes or basis functions. One popular set of basis functions are the Zernike polynomials. Each aberration may be positive or negative in value and induces predictable alterations in the image quality. Because there is no limit to the number of terms that may be used by Zernike polynomials, vision scientists use the first 15 polynomials, based on the fact that they are enough to obtain a highly accurate description of the most common aberrations found in human eye. Among these the most important Zernike coefficients affecting visual quality are coma, spherical aberration, and trefoil.

Zernike polynomials are usually expressed in terms of polar coordinates (ρ,θ), where ρ is radial coordinate and θ is the angle. The advantage of expressing the aberrations in terms of these polynomials includes the fact that the polynomials are independent of one another. For each polynomial the mean value of the aberration across the pupil is zero and the value of the coefficient gives the RMS error for that particular aberration (i.e. the coefficients show the relative contribution of each Zernike mode to the total wavefront error in the eye). However these polynomials have the disadvantage that their coefficients are only valid for the particular pupil diameter they are determined for.

In each Zernike polynomial $Z^m_n$, the subscript n is the order of aberration, all the Zernike polynomials in which n=3 are called third-order aberrations and all the polynomials with n=4, fourth order aberrations and so on. $Z^2_4$ and $Z^{-2}_4$ are usually called secondary Astigmatism and should not cause confusion. The superscript m is called the angular frequency and denotes the number of times the Wavefront pattern repeats itself.

List of Zernike modes and their common names:

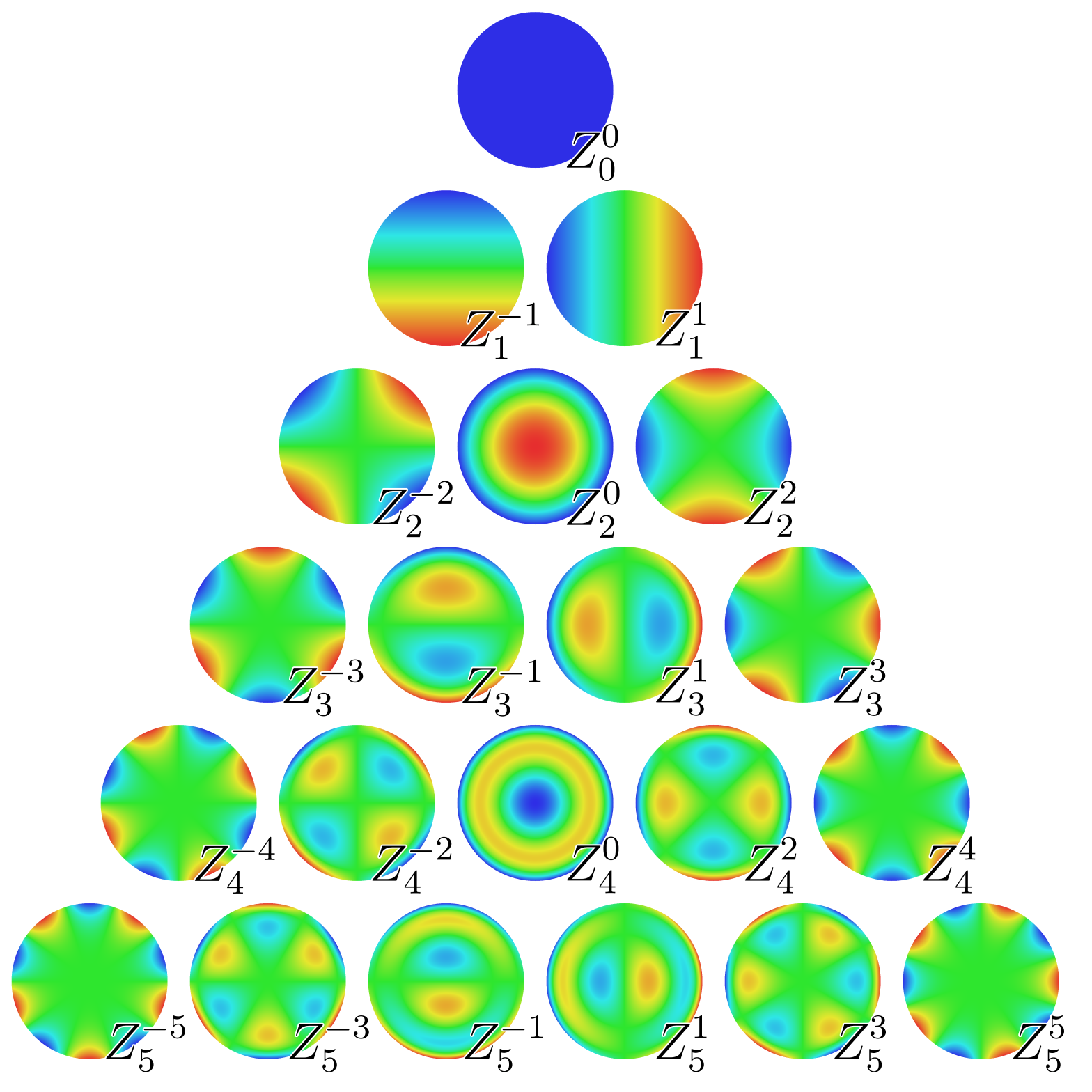
Plots of Zernike polynomials in the unit disk

Zernike Term	Name
$Z^0_0$	Piston
$Z^1_1$, $Z^{-1}_1$	Tilt (Prism)
$Z^0_2$	Defocus
$Z^2_2$, $Z^{-2}_2$	Astigmatism
$Z^2_4$, $Z^{-2}_4$	Secondary Astigmatism
$Z^0_4$	Spherical aberration
$Z^1_3$,$Z^{-1}_3$	Coma
$Z^3_3$, $Z^{-3}_3$	Trefoil
$Z^4_4$, $Z^{-4}_4$	Quadrafoil

== Management ==
Low order aberrations (hyperopia, Myopia and regular astigmatism), are correctable by eyeglasses, soft contact lenses and refractive surgery. Neither spectacles nor soft contact lenses nor routine keratorefractive surgery adequately corrects high order aberrations. Significant high order aberration usually requires a rigid gas-permeable contact lens for optimal visual rehabilitation.

Customized Wavefront-guided refractive corneal laser treatments are designed to reduce existing aberrations and to help prevent the creation of new aberrations. The wavefront map of the eye may be transferred to a Lasik system and enable the surgeon to treat the aberration. Perfect alignment of the treatment and the pupil on which the Wavefront is measured is required, which is usually achieved through iris feature detection. An efficient eye tracking system and small spot size laser is necessary for treatment. Wavefront customization of ablation increases the depth of ablation because additional corneal tissue must be ablated to compensate for the high order aberrations. Actual results with Wavefront guided LASIK showed that not only it cannot remove HOA but also the optical aberrations are increased. However, the amount of increase in aberrations are less than conventional Lasik. Corneal optical aberrations after photorefractive keratectomy with a larger ablation zone and a transition zone are less pronounced and more physiologic than those associated with first-generation (5 mm) ablations with no transition zone. An upcoming systematic review will seek to compare the safety and effectiveness of wavefront excimer laser refractive surgery with conventional excimer laser refractive surgery, and will measure differences in residual higher order aberrations between the two procedures.

Aspherical intraocular lenses (IOLs) have been used clinically to compensate for positive corneal spherical aberrations. Although Aspherical IOLs may give better contrast sensitivity, it is doubtful, whether they have a beneficial effect on distance visual acuity. Conventional (not Aspherical) IOLs give better depth of focus and better near vision. The reason for improved depth of focus in conventional lenses is linked to residual spherical aberration. The small improvement in depth of focus with the conventional IOLs enhances uncorrected near vision and contribute to reading ability.

Wavefront customized lenses can be used in eyeglasses. Based on Wavefront map of the eye and with the use of laser a lens is shaped to compensate for the aberrations of the eye and then put in the eyeglasses. Ultraviolet Laser can alter the refractive index of curtain lens materials such as epoxy polymer on a point by point basis in order to generate the desired refractive profile.

Wavefront customized contact lenses can theoretically correct HOA. The rotation and decentration reduces the predictability of this method.

== See also ==
- Optical aberrations
- Wavefront
- Zernike polynomials
