= Southern African Large Telescope =

Astronomical optical telescope

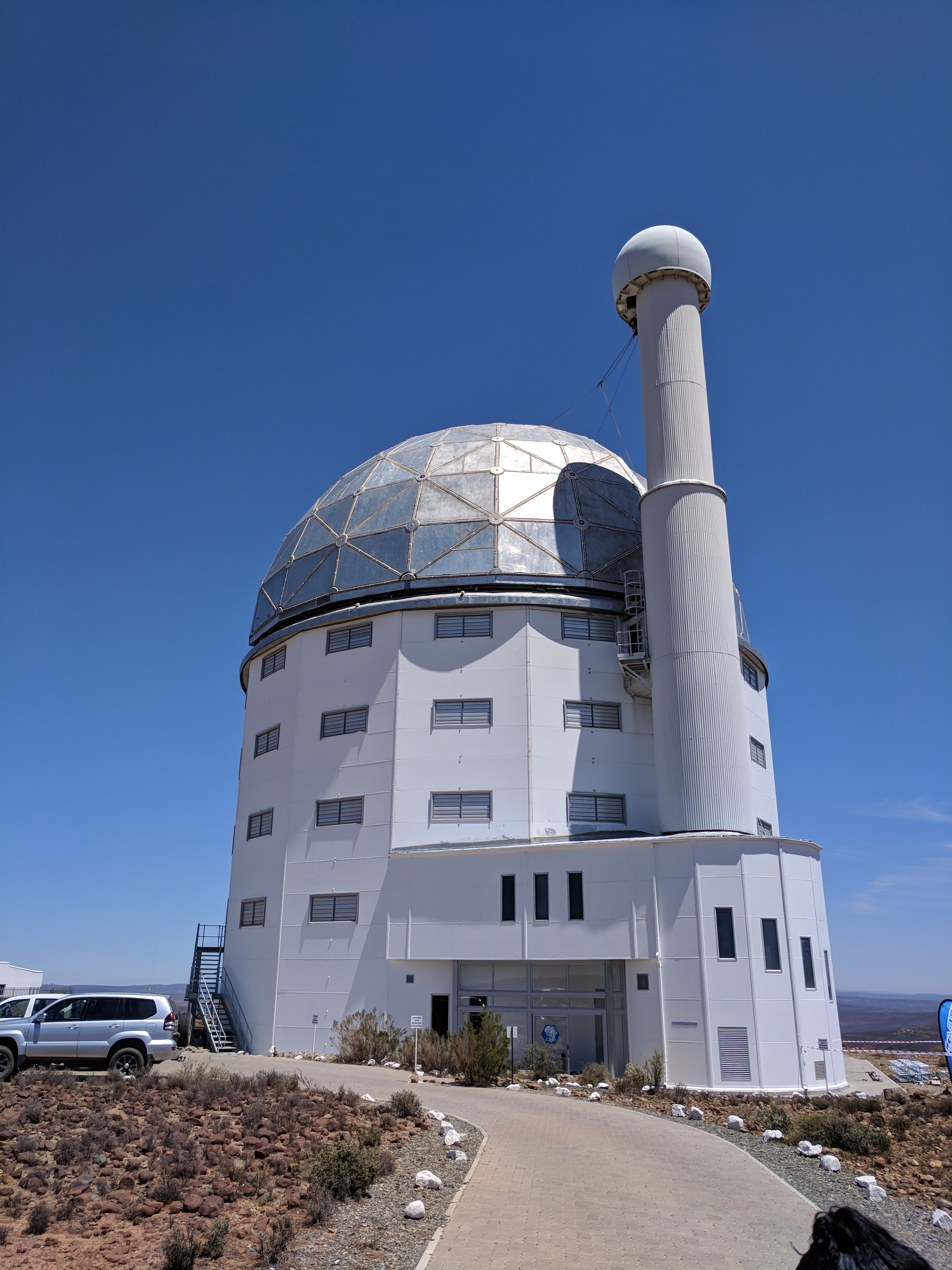
- Alternative names: SALT
- Location(s): Karoo Hoogland Local Municipality, Namakwa District Municipality, Northern Cape, RSA
- Coordinates: 32°22′33″S 20°48′39″E
- Altitude: 1,798 m (5,899 ft)
- Wavelength: 320 nm (940 THz)–1,700 nm (180 THz)
- Built: 2005
- Diameter: hexagonal array of ~11.1 m × 9.8 m 9.2 m (effective aperture)
- Angular resolution: EE(50) ≤ 0.6"
- Collecting area: 79 m^{2} (91 × 0.87 m^{2}); 66.5 m^{2} (effective aperture)
- Mounting: 45 ton steel structure
- Enclosure: 25 m spherical
- Website: www.salt.ac.za
- Location of Southern African Large Telescope
- Related media on Commons

The Southern African Large Telescope (SALT) is a 9.2-metre optical telescope designed mainly for spectroscopy. It consists of 91 hexagonal mirror segments each with a 1-metre inscribed diameter, resulting in a total hexagonal mirror of 11.1 by 9.8 m. However, its effective aperture is only 9.2 m. It is located close to the town of Sutherland in the semi-desert region of the Karoo, South Africa. It is a facility of the South African Astronomical Observatory, the national optical observatory of South Africa.

SALT is the largest optical telescope in the Southern Hemisphere. It enables spectroscopic and polarimetric analysis and imaging of the radiation of astronomical objects that are not viewable from Northern Hemisphere telescopes.

It is closely based on the Hobby–Eberly Telescope (HET) at McDonald Observatory, with some changes in its design, especially to the spherical aberration corrector. The main purpose for these changes was to improve the telescope's field of view. It shares the same fixed mirror altitude design, which limits access to 70% of the visible sky.

First light with the full mirror was declared on 1 September 2005, with 1-arc-second resolution images of globular cluster 47 Tucanae, open cluster NGC 6152, spiral galaxy NGC 6744, and the Lagoon Nebula. The official opening by President Thabo Mbeki took place during the inauguration ceremony on 10 November 2005.

South Africa contributed about a third of the total of US$36 million that will finance SALT for its first 10 years (US$20 million for the construction of the telescope, US$6 million for instruments, and US$10 million for operations). The rest was contributed by the other partners: Germany, Poland, the United States, the United Kingdom, and New Zealand.

== General information ==
SALT is located on a hilltop 1837 m above sea level in a nature reserve in the Hantam, Karoo 370 km (230 mi) north-east of Cape Town, near the small town of Sutherland. In March 2004, installation of the massive mirror began. The last of the 91 smaller mirrored hexagon segments was put in place in May 2005.

Korea, Japan, Poland and Google have telescopes at the site and South Africa has at least five optical telescopes there. The University of Birmingham has a solar telescope to help monitor the Sun. SALT will probe quasars and enable scientists to view stars and galaxies a billion times too faint to be seen by the naked eye.

== Primary mirror ==
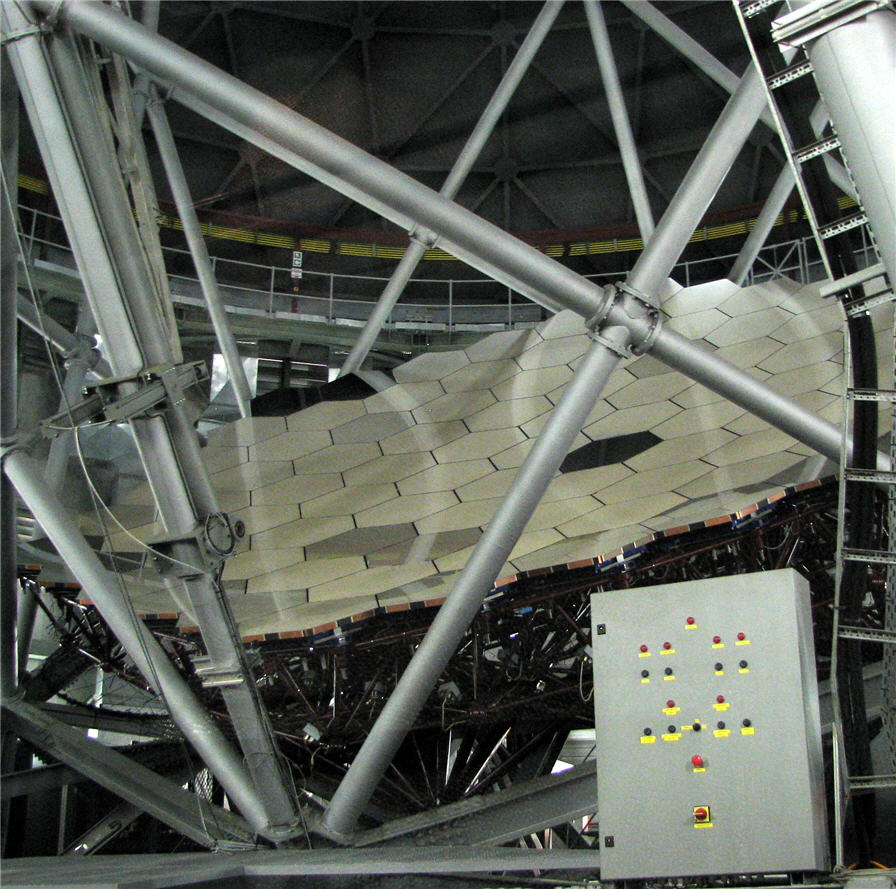

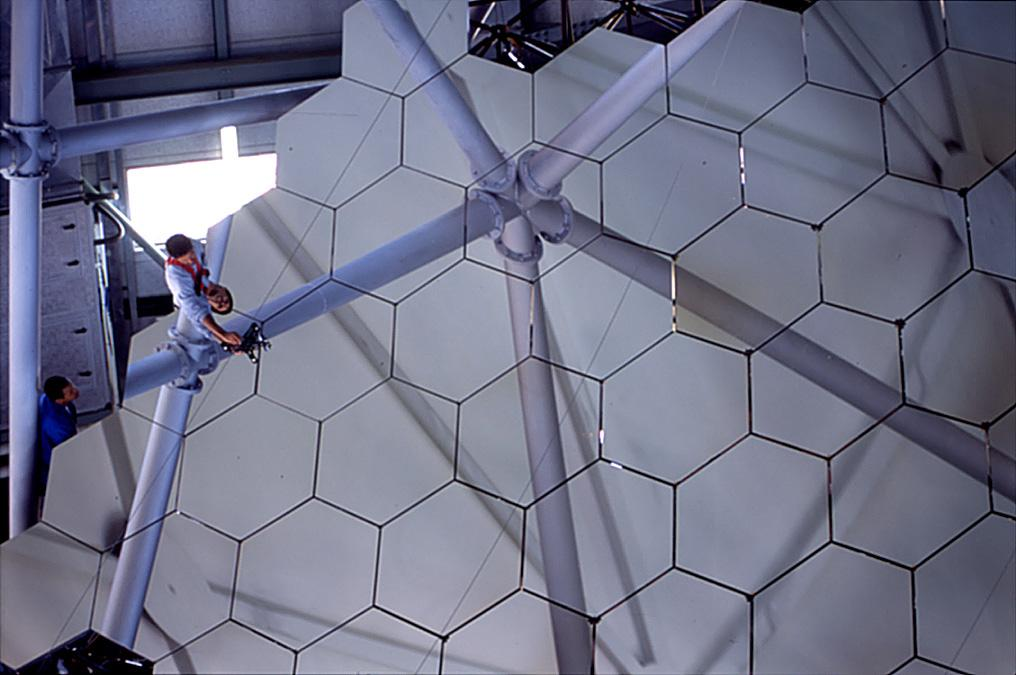
SALT's primary mirror

Cleaning of the South African Large Telescope mirrors with dry ice

Both SALT and HET have an unusual design for an optical telescope. Similar to the Keck Telescopes, the primary mirror is composed of an array of mirrors designed to act as a single larger mirror; however, the SALT mirrors produce a spherical primary, rather than the paraboloid shape associated with a classical Cassegrain telescope. Each SALT mirror is a 1-meter hexagon, and the array of 91 identical mirrors produces a hexagonally shaped primary 11 by 9.8 meters in size. To compensate for the spherical primary, the telescope has a four-mirror spherical aberration corrector (SAC) that provides a corrected, flat focal plane with a field of view of 8 arcminutes at prime focus.

Size comparison: primary mirrors of some notable telescopes

Each of the 91 mirrors is made of low-expansion Sitall glass and can be adjusted in tip, tilt and piston in order to properly align them so as to act as a single mirror. Because the mirror is spherical, light emitted from a position corresponding to the center of curvature of the mirror is reflected and refocused to the same position. Therefore, the telescope employs a center-of-curvature alignment sensor (CCAS) situated at the top of a tall tower adjacent to the dome. Laser light is shone down on all the segments, and the position of the reflections from each mirror measured. A process called "stacking" thus allows the telescope operator to optimize the adjustments of the mirrors.

The telescope is also unusual in that during an observation, the mirror remains at a fixed altitude and azimuth, and the image of an astronomical target produced by the telescope is tracked by the "payload", which resides at the position of prime focus and includes the SAC and prime-focus instrumentation. This is similar in operation to the Arecibo Radio Telescope. Although this results in only a limited observing window per target, it greatly simplifies the primary mirror mount, when compared to a fully steerable telescope, transferring the complexity to the smaller and lighter payload tracking system, providing for an overall reduction in total telescope construction cost. SALT has a fixed zenith angle of 37 degrees, optimised for the Magellanic clouds, but because of the full range of azimuths and the celestial rotation, SALT has access to a good fraction of the sky available at the Sutherland site.

Another consequence of this design is that the entrance pupil varies in size during the tracking of a target.

== Instrumentation ==
The first generation instrumentation for SALT includes the SALT Imaging Camera (SALTICAM), designed and built by the South African Astronomical Observatory (SAAO); the Robert Stobie Spectrograph (RSS) (née Prime Focus Imaging Spectrograph), a multi-purpose long-slit and multi-object imaging spectrograph and spectropolarimeter, designed and built by the University of Wisconsin–Madison, Rutgers University, and the SAAO; and a fiber-fed High Resolution Spectrograph (HRS), designed by the University of Canterbury (New Zealand). SALTICAM was installed in early 2005, while the RSS was installed on 11 October 2005.

== Internet connectivity ==
The telescope is connected to the SAAO site in Cape Town via a 1 Gbit/s fibre connection over the SANREN network. The SAAO has a 1 Gbit/s connection to the SANREN network with 30 Mbit/s of that link being the international portion.

== Science working group ==
Membership of the SALT science working group:

David Buckley, Gerald Cecil, Brian Chaboyer, Richard Griffiths, Janusz Kałużny, Michael Albrow, Karen Pollard, Kenneth Nordsieck, Darragh O'Donoghue, Larry Ramsey, Anne Sansom, Pat Cote.

== Partners ==
- Dartmouth College
- Georg-August-Universität Göttingen
- Hobby-Eberly Telescope Board
- National Research Foundation of South Africa
- Nicolaus Copernicus Astronomical Center of the Polish Academy of Sciences
- Rutgers, the State University of New Jersey
- University of Wisconsin–Madison
- University of Canterbury (New Zealand)
- University of North Carolina at Chapel Hill
- United Kingdom SALT Consortium (UKSC), comprising:
  - Armagh Observatory
  - Keele University
  - University of Central Lancashire
  - University of Nottingham
  - Open University
  - University of Southampton

In 2007, the following new partners joined the SALT consortium:

- American Museum of Natural History
- Inter-University Centre for Astronomy and Astrophysics (India)

== Research ==
Research using SALT at the South African Astronomical Observatory has led the facility to important discoveries. By using the Southern African Large Telescope, SAAO has the ability to take "snapshots" of stars in very quick succession. It is optimized for wavelengths and observing modes not available on other very large telescopes. As a result, astronomers can study rapidly changing properties of compact stars, primarily as they pull in gas from their companion stars or surroundings. The significance of this discovery allows us to detect black holes. The gravitational field of a compact star commonly pulls in gas from a companion star, thus radiation (especially X-ray) is emitted. Scientists used this as an indirect way to locate black holes. Another phenomenon that SALT has helped astronomers investigate is the way that masses build up on some compact stars until supernova explosions blow them apart, which gives scientists a "Type Ia" supernovae used to show that the expansion of the universe is speeding up.

Other note-worthy research the South African Astronomical Observatory has achieved using SALT include the discovery of a class of stars known as "polar", or a pair of stars. The "polar" binary star system, where a compactor star called a "white dwarf" whose volume has shrunk about one millionth of a star like the Sun. Studies using SALT concluded that these polar binary star systems take only an hour and a half to complete an orbit. Also, the SALT telescope allows scientists to study the rapid brightness changes in exotic stars.

More research using SALT has aided astronomers to investigate the structure and evolution of our galaxy, such as quasars, Magellanic clouds, the galactic structure and stellar astrophysics. SALT released its first color images, which marked the achievement of the "first light". This also marked the debut of the fully operating SALTICAM, which is a $600,000 digital camera designed and built for SALT.

== Tourism ==
Despite initial estimates by SAAO that SALT would bring up to 30,000 tourists to Sutherland, the telescope has so far only resulted in about 14,000 annual visitors, which has nevertheless resulted in the creation of at least 300 jobs in the town of 5,000.

== See also ==
- South African Astronomical Observatory
- List of astronomical observatories
- SEDS SEDS South Africa
- List of optical telescopes
- List of largest optical reflecting telescopes
