= Ramotholo Sefako =

South African astronomer (born 1971)

- Born: 28 April 1971; Qwa-Qwa, Free State
- Scientific career
- Fields: Astrophysicist
- Institutions: South African Astronomical Observatory (SAAO)

Ramotholo Rafael Sefako (born 1971) is a South African astrophysicist. He is one of the first three black astro-physicists in South Africa.

== Biography ==
Sefako matriculated with distinction from Khukhune High School in Botha-Bothe-Lesotho and obtained his BSc degree at the University of Lesotho.

He received his doctorate in astronomy from the Potchefstroom University for Christian Higher Education (abbreviated PU for CHE).

In 2005, he joined South African Astronomical Observatory (SAAO) as a post-doctoral fellow, and later a Southern African Large Telescope(SALT) astronomer. Currently, he is the head of the Telescope Operations (TOPS) Division at SAAO.

== Astronomy Research ==
Dr Ramotholo Sefako's research interests include multi-wavelength studies of blazars and pulsar-driven nebulae to unravel how these objects produce high energies, up to gamma rays. Moreover, he has published various journals collaboration with other physicists around the world.
