= NGC 6152 =

Star cluster in the constellation Norma

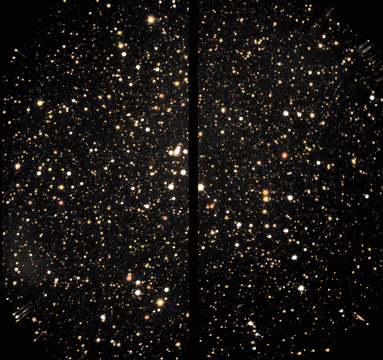
- A Southern African Large Telescope (SALT) image of NGC 6152.

Observation data (J2000 epoch)
- Right ascension: 16^{h} 32.7^{m}
- Declination: −52° 38′

Physical characteristics
- Other designations: Cr 304

Associations
- Constellation: Norma

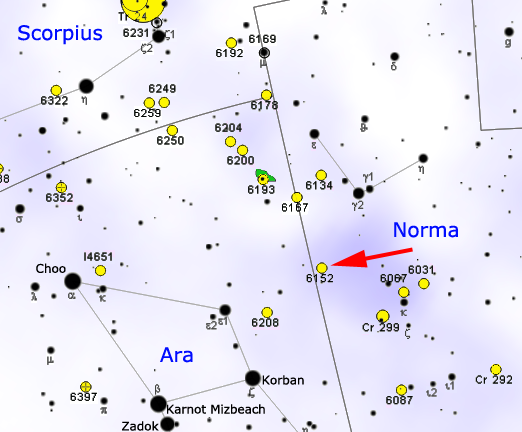
Map showing the location of NGC 6152

NGC 6152 is an open cluster of stars located in the constellation Norma. It was discovered by John Herschel in 1834.
