= Pseudo-Zernike polynomials =

In mathematics, pseudo-Zernike polynomials are well known and widely used in the analysis of optical systems. They are also widely used in image analysis as shape descriptors.

== Definition ==
They are an orthogonal set of complex-valued polynomials defined as

$$V_{nm}(x,y) = R_{nm}(x,y)e^{jm\arctan(\frac{y}{x})},$$

where $x^2+y^2\leq 1, n\geq 0, |m|\leq n$ and orthogonality on the unit disk is given as

$$\int_0^{2\pi}\int_0^1 r [V_{nl}(r\cos\theta,r\sin\theta)]^* \times
V_{mk}(r\cos\theta,r\sin\theta)\,dr\,d\theta =
\frac{\pi}{n+1}\delta_{mn}\delta_{kl},$$

where the star means complex conjugation, and $r^2 = x^2+y^2$, $x=r\cos\theta$, $y=r\sin\theta$ are the standard transformations between polar and Cartesian coordinates.

The radial polynomials $R_{nm}$ are defined as

$R_{nm}(r) = \sum_{s=0}^{n-|m|}D_{n,|m|,s}\ r^{n-s}$

with integer coefficients

$$D_{n,|m|,s} = (-1)^s\frac{(2n+1-s)!}{s!(n-|m|-s)!(n+|m|-s+1)!}.$$

== Examples ==
Examples are:

$R_{0,0} = 1$

$R_{1,0} = -2+3 r$

$R_{1,1} = r$

$R_{2,0} = 3+10 r^2-12 r$

$R_{2,1} = 5 r^2-4 r$

$R_{2,2} = r^2$

$R_{3,0} = -4+35 r^3-60 r^2+30 r$

$R_{3,1} = 21 r^3-30 r^2+10 r$

$R_{3,2} = 7 r^3-6 r^2$

$R_{3,3} = r^3$

$R_{4,0} = 5+126 r^4-280 r^3+210 r^2-60 r$

$R_{4,1} = 84 r^4-168 r^3+105 r^2-20 r$

$R_{4,2} = 36 r^4-56 r^3+21 r^2$

$R_{4,3} = 9 r^4-8 r^3$

$R_{4,4} = r^4$

$R_{5,0} = -6+462 r^5-1260 r^4+1260 r^3-560 r^2+105 r$

$R_{5,1} = 330 r^5-840 r^4+756 r^3-280 r^2+35 r$

$R_{5,2} = 165 r^5-360 r^4+252 r^3-56 r^2$

$R_{5,3} = 55 r^5-90 r^4+36 r^3$

$R_{5,4} = 11 r^5-10 r^4$

$R_{5,5} = r^5$

== Moments ==
The pseudo-Zernike Moments (PZM) of order $n$ and repetition $l$ are defined as

$$A_{nl}=\frac{n+1}{\pi}\int_0^{2\pi}\int_0^1 [V_{nl}(r\cos\theta,r\sin\theta)]^*
f(r\cos\theta,r\sin\theta)r\,dr\,d\theta,$$

where $n = 0, \ldots \infty$, and $l$ takes on positive and negative integer values subject to $|l|\leq n$.

The image function can be reconstructed by expansion of the pseudo-Zernike coefficients on the unit disk as

$$f(x,y) = \sum_{n=0}^{\infty}\sum_{l=-n}^{+n}A_{nl}V_{nl}(x,y).$$

Pseudo-Zernike moments are derived from conventional Zernike moments and shown to be more robust and less sensitive to image noise than the Zernike moments.

== See also ==
- Zernike polynomials
- Image moment
