= Tilt (optics) =

Deviation in the direction of a beam of light

In optics, tilt is a deviation in the direction a beam of light propagates.

== Overview ==
Tilt quantifies the average slope in both the X and Y directions of a wavefront or phase profile across the pupil of an optical system. In conjunction with piston (the first Zernike polynomial term), X and Y tilt can be modeled using the second and third Zernike polynomials:

X-Tilt: $a_1 \rho \cos(\theta)$

Y-Tilt: $a_2 \rho \sin(\theta)$

where $\rho$ is the normalized radius with $0 \le \rho \le 1$ and $\theta$ is the azimuthal angle with $0 \le \theta \le 2\pi$.

The $a_1$ and $a_2$ coefficients are typically expressed as a fraction of a chosen wavelength of light.

Piston and tilt are not actually true optical aberrations, as they do not represent or model curvature in the wavefront. Defocus is the lowest order true optical aberration. If piston and tilt are subtracted from an otherwise perfect wavefront, a perfect, aberration-free image is formed.

Rapid optical tilts in both X and Y directions are termed jitter. Jitter can arise from three-dimensional mechanical vibration, and from rapidly varying 3D refraction in aerodynamic flowfields. Jitter may be compensated in an adaptive optics system by using a flat mirror mounted on a dynamic two-axis mount that allows small, rapid, computer-controlled changes in the mirror X and Y angles. This is often termed a "fast steering mirror", or FSM. A gimbaled optical pointing system cannot mechanically track an object or stabilize a projected laser beam to much better than several hundred microradians. Buffeting due to aerodynamic turbulence further degrades the pointing stability.

Light, however, has no appreciable momentum, and by reflecting from a computer-driven FSM, an image or laser beam can be stabilized to single microradians, or even a few hundred nanoradians. This almost totally eliminates image blurring due to motion, and far-field laser beam jitter. Limitations on the degree of line-of-sight stabilization arise from the limited dynamic range of the FSM tilt, and the highest frequency the mirror tilt angle can be changed. Most FSM's can be driven to several wavelengths of tilt, and at frequencies exceeding one kilohertz.

As the FSM mirror is optically flat, FSM's need not be located at pupil images. Two FSM's can be combined to create an anti-beamwalk pair, which stabilizes not only the beam pointing angle but the location of the beam center. Anti-beamwalk FSM's are positioned prior to a deformable mirror (which must be located at a pupil image) to stabilize the position of the pupil image on the deformable mirror and minimize correction errors resulting from wavefront movement, or shearing, on the deformable mirror faceplate.
