= Piston (optics) =

In optics, piston is the mean value of a wavefront or phase profile across the pupil of an optical system. The piston coefficient is typically expressed in wavelengths of light at a particular wavelength. Its main use is in curve-fitting wavefronts with Cartesian polynomials or Zernike polynomials.

However, similar to a real engine piston moving up and down in its cylinder, optical piston values can be changed to bias the wavefront phase mean value as desired. As phase values can only vary from zero to 2π, then repeat in either direction (termed phase wrapping), changing the piston coefficient changes the zero phase value contour locations across the wavefront. This property is critical to the operation of phase-measuring interferometers, which give not only the magnitude but also the sign (convexity or concavity) of a wavefront under test. Piston is physically created in the interferometer by piezoelectric actuators that translate the Fizeau interferometer reference surface along the optical axis by precise fractions of the test wavelength, usually by one quarter of a wavelength. This changes the interferometric fringe patterns and allows direct calculation of the exact wavefront error.

Piston and tilt are not actually true optical aberrations, as they do not represent or model curvature in the wavefront. Defocus is the lowest order true optical aberration. If piston and tilt are subtracted from an otherwise perfect wavefront, a perfect, aberration-free image is formed.
