= Ronchi =

Ronchi may refer to:

== People ==
- Ronchi (name)

== Places ==
- Ronchi, a neighborhood in the town of Bra in Cuneo province in Italy's northwest Piedmont region near France
- Ronchi, a frazione (hamlet) of Massa, Tuscany
- Ronchi dei Legionari, a town in Italy near Trieste
- Ronchi Valsugana, a comune (municipality) in the Province of Trento

== Other uses ==
- Rhonchi, abnormal sounds from the lungs indicating an abnormal medical condition
- Ronchi test, a method of determining the figure of a mirror used in telescopes and other optical devices, invented by Vasco Ronchi
- Ronchi ruling, a pattern for optical measurements like linear encoders

== See also ==
- Ronchis, a comune in the Province of Udine
