= List of largest optical telescopes in the 20th century =

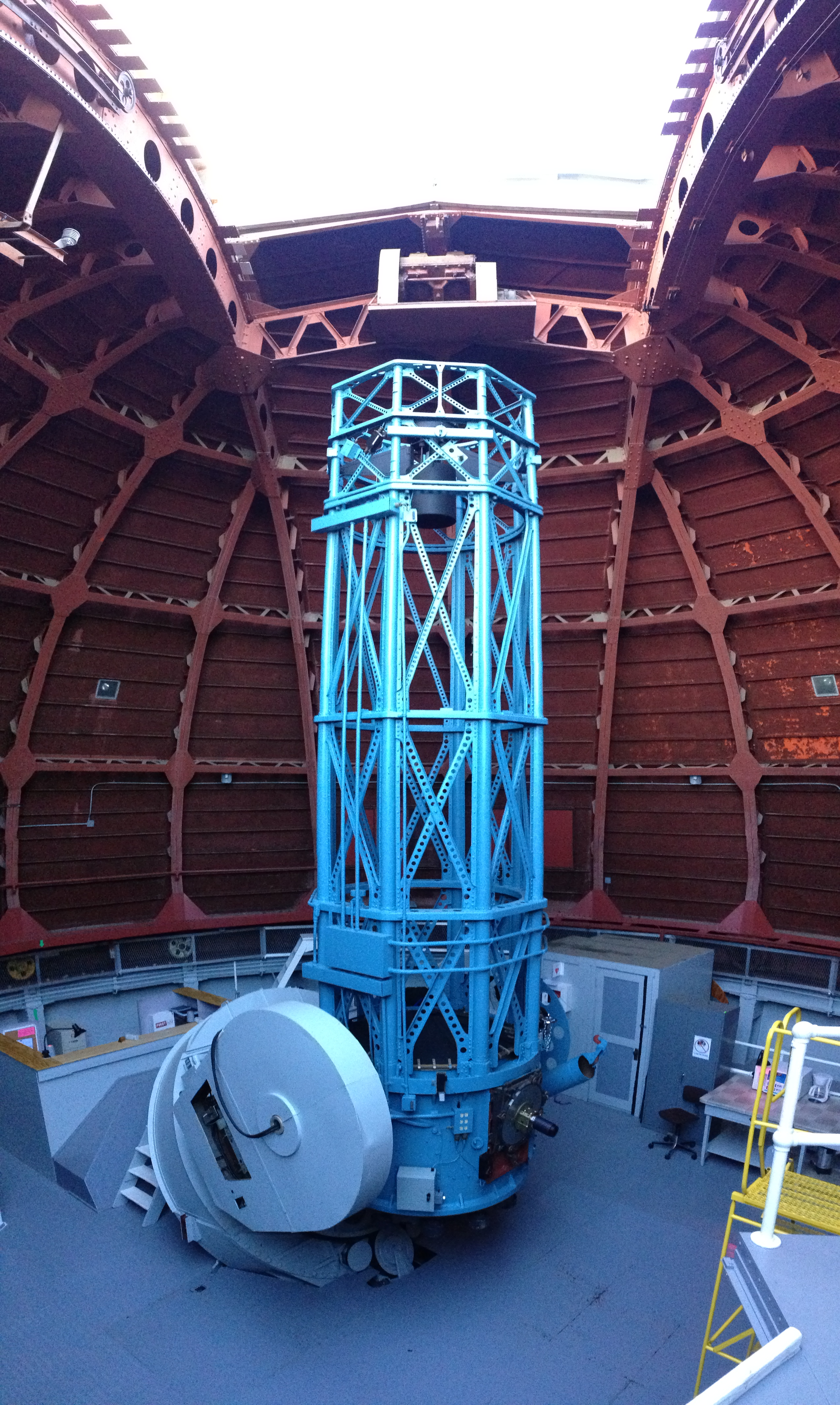
The 60-inch telescope, first light in 1908

The following is a list of the largest optical telescopes in the 20th century, paying special attention to the diameter of the mirror or lens of the telescope's objective, or aperture. Aperture rank currently goes approximately by the usable physical aperture size and not by aperture synthesis, although interferometers attained some of the highest angular resolutions at visible and infrared wavelengths compared to traditional telescopes. Diverging methods of construction and use for reflecting telescopes in that area make comparing synthesized aperture irregular.

For instance, Keck I or II alone has less angular resolution than the Keck Interferometer (Keck I & II together), however, the Keck Interferometer is used for a much narrower range of type of observations. Ultimately, a valid comparison between two telescopes must take into consideration more specifications, when a general measurement becomes obtuse.

Aperture of the primary mirror alone can be poor measure of a reflective telescope's significance; for example, the Hubble Space Telescope has only a 2.4 metres (94 in) primary mirror. In addition, many large or significant telescopes are not optical and/or reflecting. However, many famous optical telescopes have had large apertures on their primary mirror with corresponding good angular resolution.

The list includes optical observatories, including UV, visible and some optical infrared telescopes, and near infrared. The list covers from about 1901 to 2001, with some flexibility to accommodate ambiguity in classification, for example some 2002 telescopes, if it was nearly operation in 2001. 19th century and earlier telescopes that ceased operation are not included, but the list is not complete.

== Table of optical telescopes ==
Multiple mirror telescopes are ranked by their equivalent optical area, not peak interferometric aperture unless it is not relevant for the design. See also List of astronomical interferometers at visible and infrared wavelengths.

See also List of largest optical refracting telescopes, as this list does yet not include such large refractors as the Yerkes Observatory.

| Name/Observatory | Aperture m | Aper. in | Mirror type | Nationality of Sponsors | Site and/or Observatory | FL or Built | Image |
|---|---|---|---|---|---|---|---|
| Keck 1 | 10 m | 394″ | Segmented, 36 | United States | Mauna Kea Observatory, Hawaii | 1993 | |
| Keck 2 | 10 m | 394″ | Segmented, 36 | United States | Mauna Kea Observatory, Hawaii | 1996 | |
| Hobby–Eberly Telescope (HET) | 9.2 m | 362″ | Segmented,91 | United States, Germany | McDonald Observatory, Texas | 1997 | |
| Subaru (JNLT) | 8.2 m | 323″ | Single | Japan | Mauna Kea Observatory, Hawaii | 1999 | |
| VLT 1 (Antu) | 8.2 m | 323″ | Single | ESO Countries + Chile | Paranal Observatory, Chile | 1998 | |
| VLT 2 (Kueyen) | 8.2 m | 323″ | Single | ESO Countries + Chile | Paranal Observatory, Chile | 1999 | |
| VLT 3 (Melipal) | 8.2 m | 323″ | Single | ESO Countries + Chile | Paranal Observatory, Chile | 2000* | |
| VLT 4 (Yepun) | 8.2 m | 323″ | Single | ESO Countries + Chile | Paranal Observatory, Chile | 2001* | |
| Gemini North (Gillett) | 8.1 m | 318″ | Single | United States, Canada, Chile, Australia, Argentina, Brazil | Mauna Kea Obs., Hawaii | 1999 | |
| Gemini South | 8.1 m | 318″ | Single | United States, Canada, Chile, Australia, Argentina, Brazil | Cerro Pachón, Chile | 2001 | |
| MMT | 6.5 m | 256″ | Single | United States | F. L. Whipple Obs., Arizona | 2000 | |
| Magellan 1 (Walter Baade) | 6.5 m | 256″ | Honeycomb | United States | Las Campanas Obs., Chile | 2000 | |
| Magellan 2 (Landon Clay) | 6.5 m | 256″ | Honeycomb | United States | Las Campanas Obs., Chile | 2002* | |
| BTA-6 | 6 m | 238″ | Single | USSR + Russia | Zelenchukskaya, Caucasus | 1976 | |
| Hale Telescope (200 inch) | 5.08 m | 200″ | Single | United States | Palomar Observatory, California | 1948 | |
| MMT (original) (6 × 1.8 m) optics replaced | 4.7 m (6 × 1.8 m) | 186″ | 6 mirrors | United States | F. L. Whipple Obs., Arizona | 1979–1998 | |
| William Herschel Telescope | 4.2 m | 165″ | Single | UK, Netherlands, Spain | ORM, Canary Islands | 1987 | |
| SOAR | 4.1 m | 161″ | Single | United States, Brazil | Cerro Pachón, Chile | 2002* | |
| Nicholas U. Mayall 4m | 4 m | 158″ | Single | USA | Kitt Peak National Obs.; Arizona | 1973 | |
| Victor M. Blanco Telescope | 4 m | 158″ | Single | USA | Cerro Tololo Inter-American Obs., Chile | 1976 | |
| Anglo-Australian Telescope (AAT) | 3.89 m | 154″ | Single | United Kingdom + Australia | Anglo-Australian Obs.; Siding Spring, Australia | 1975 | |
| United Kingdom Infrared Telescope (UKIRT) | 3.8 m | 150″ | Single IR | United Kingdom | Mauna Kea Observatories; Mauna Kea, Hawaii | 1978 | |
| 3.67m AEOS Telescope (AEOS) | 3.67 m | 145″ | Single | United States | Air Force Maui Optical Station; Haleakala, Hawaii | 1996 | |
| Telescopio Nazionale Galileo (TNG) | 3.58 m | 138″ | Single | Italy | ORM; La Palma, Canary Islands | 1997 | |
| New Technology Telescope (NTT) | 3.58 m | 142″ | Single | ESO countries | European Southern Observatory; Cerro La Silla, Chile | 1989 | |
| Canada-France-Hawaii Telescope (CFHT) | 3.58 m | 141″ | Single | Canada, France, United States | Mauna Kea Observatories, USA | 1979 | |
| ESO 3.6 m Telescope | 3.57 m | 140″ | Single | ESO countries | European Southern Observatory; Cerro La Silla, Chile | 1977 | |
| MPI-CAHA 3.5m | 3.5 m | 138″ | Single | West Germany+Spain | Calar Alto Obs., Spain | 1984 | |
| USAF Starfire 3.5m | 3.5 m | 138″ | Single | USA | Starfire Optical Range; New Mexico | 1994 | |
| WIYN Telescope | 3.5 m | 138″ | Single | USA | Kitt Peak National Obs., USA | 1994 | |
| Astrophysical Research Consortium (ARC) | 3.48 m | 137″ | Single | USA | Apache Point Obs.; Sacramento Peak, New Mexico | 1994 | |
| Infrared Telescope Facility (IRTF) | 3.2 m | 126″ | Single IR | United States | Mauna Kea, Hawaii | 1979 | |
| Shane Telescope | 3.05 m | 120″ | Single | United States | Lick Observatory; Mt. Hamilton, California | 1959 | |
| NASA-LMT (NODO) retired | 3 m | 118″ | Liquid | USA | Sacramento Peak, New Mexico, USA | 1995–2002 | |
| Harlan J. Smith Telescope | 2.72 m | 107″ | Single | USA | McDonald Observatory, Texas, USA | 1969- | |
| UBC-Laval LMT | 2.65 m | 104″ | Liquid | Canada | Vancouver, Canada | 1992– | |
| Shajn 2.6m (Crimean 102 in) | 2.64 m | 103″ | Single | | Crimean Astrophysical Obs., Ukraine | 1961 | |
| BAO 2.6 | 2.6 m | 102″ | Single | | Byurakan Astrophysical Obs.; Mt. Aragatz, Armenia | 1976 | |
| Nordic Optical Telescope (NOT) | 2.56 m | 101″ | Single | Denmark, Sweden, Iceland, Norway, Finland | La Palma, Canary Islands | 1988 | |
| Isaac Newton Telescope (INT) | 2.54 m | 100″ | Zerodur | UK | La Palma, Canary Islands moved/new mirror | 1984 | |
| du Pont | 2.54 m | 100″ | Single | USA | Las Campanas Observatory, Chile | 1976 | |
| Hooker 100-Inch Telescope | 2.54 m | 100″ | Single | United States | Mt. Wilson Observatory; California | 1917 | |
| Sloan DSS | 2.5 m | 98″ | Single | United States | Sacramento Peak, New Mexico | 1997 | |
| Isaac Newton Telescope (INT) | 2.54 m | 98″ | Single | UK | RGO, Sussex, England (original) | 1965–1979 | |
| Hiltner Telescope | 2.4 m | 95″ | Single | United States | MDM Observatory, Kitt Peak, Arizona | 1986 | |
| Hubble (HST) | 2.4 m | 94″ | Single | NASA+ESA | Low Earth orbit | 1990 | |
| Vainu Bappu | 2.34 m | 92″ | Single | | Vainu Bappu Observatory, India | 1986 | |
| WIRO 2.3 | 2.3 m | 90.5″ | Single | USA | Wyoming, USA | 1977 | |
| ANU 2.3m ATT | 2.3 m | 90″ | Single | Australia | Siding Spring Obs., Australia | 1984 | |
| Bok Telescope (90-inch) | 2.3 m | 90″ | Single | USA | Steward Obs., Kitt Peak, Arizona | 1969 | |
| University of Hawaii 2.2 m | 2.24 m | 88″ | Single | USA | Mauna Kea Observatories, Hawaii | 1970 | |
| MPIA-ESO (ESO-MPI) | 2.2 m | 87″ | Single | West Germany | Cerro La Silla, Chile | 1984 | |
| MPIA-CAHA 2.2m | 2.2 m | 87″ | Single | West Germany | Calar Alto Observatory, Spain | 1979 | |
| Xinglong 2.16m | 2.16 m | 85″ | Single | PRC (China) | Xinglong, China | 1989 | |
| Jorge Sahade 2.15m | 2.15 m | 84″ | Single | | Leoncito Astronomical Complex, Argentina | 1987 | |
| INAOE 2.12 (OAGH) | 2.12 m | 83″ | Single | Mexico, USA | Guillermo Haro Observatory; Sonora | 1987 | |
| UNAM 2.12 | 2.12 m | 83" | Single | | NAO; San Pedro, Mexico | 1979 | |
| Kitt Peak 2.1-meter | 2.1 m | 83″ | Single | USA | Kitt Peak (KNPO), USA | 1964 | |
| Otto Struve Telescope | 2.1 m | 82 | Single | USA | McDonald Observatory, USA | 1939 | |
| Himalayan Chandra Telescope (HCT) | 2.01 m | 79″ | Single | India | Indian Astronomical Obs., Hanle (4500 m) | 2000 | |
| Alfred Jensch Teleskop | 2 m | 79″ | Single | | Karl Schwarzschild Observatory | 1960 | |
| Carl Zeiss Jena | 2 m | 79″ | Single | | Shamakhi Astrophysical Obs., Azerbaijan | 1966 | |
| Ondřejov 2-m | 2 m | 79″ | Single | Czechoslovakia | Ondřejov Observatory, Czechia | 1967 | |
| Ritchey-Chretien-Coude (RCC) | 2 m | 79″ | Single | | Rozhen Observatory, Bulgaria | 1984 | |
| Carl Zeiss Jena | 2 m | 79″ | Single | | Main Ukraine Obs. | | |
| Bernard Lyot Telescope | 2 m | 79″ | Single | France | Pic du Midi Obs., France | 1980 | |
| Faulkes Telescope South | 2 m | 79″ | Single | UK | Siding Spring Obs., Australia | 2001 | |
| MAGNUM | 2 m | 79″ | Single IR | Japan | Haleakala Obs., USA | 2001 | |
| OHP 1.93 | 1.93 m | 76″ | Single | France | Haute-Provence Observatory, France | 1958 | |
| 74-inch Radcliffe Telescope (1.9 m) | 1.88 m | 74″ | Single | | South African Astronomical Obs., Sutherland, 1974–Present; Radcliffe Obs.,1948– 1974 | 1950 | |
| 188 cm telescope | 1.88 m | 74″ | Single | Japan | Okayama Astrophysical Observatory, Japan | 1960 | |
| DDO 1.88 m | 1.88 m | 74″ | Single | Canada | David Dunlap Observatory, Ontario | 1935 | |
| 74" reflector | 1.88 m | 74″ | Single | Australia | Mount Stromlo Observatory, Australia | 1955–2003 | |
| Kottamia telescope 1.88 m | 1.88 m | 74″ | Single | Egypt | Egypt | 1960 | |
| Vatican Advanced Technology Telescope (VATT) | 1.83 m | 72″ | Single | Vatican City | Mt. Graham International Obs., Arizona | 1993 | |
| 72-Inch Perkins Telescope | 1.83 m | 72″ | Single | USA | Lowell Observatory, Anderson Mesa USA | 1964 | |
| Plaskett telescope | 1.83 m | 72″ | Single | Canada | Dominion Astrophysical Observatory, Canada | 1918 | |
| Copernico 182 cm | 1.82 m | 72″ | Single | Italy | Asiago Observatory, Italy (1350 m) | 1973 | |
| 1.8m Ritchey Cretien reflector | 1.8 m | 72″ | Single | Korea | Bohyunsan Optical Astronomy Observatory, Korea | 1996 | |
| Sandy Cross Telescope | 1.8 m | 71″ | Single | Canada | Rothney Astrophysical Observatory | 1996 | |
| Spacewatch 1.8-meter Telescope | 1.8 m | 71″ | Single | USA | Kitt Peak National Observatory, USA | 2001 | |
| 69-inch Perkins Telescope | 1.75 m | 69″ | Single | USA | Perkins Observatory, Ohio | 1931–1964 | |
| 165 cm telescope | 1.65 m | 65″ | Single | | Moletai Astronomical Obs., Lithuania | 1991 | |
| McMath–Pierce Solar Telescope | 1.61 m | 63″ | Single | USA | Kitt Peak National Obs., USA | 1962 | |
| AZT-33 | 1.6 m | 63″ | Single | | Sayan Solar Obs., Siberia (2000m) | 1981 | |
| 1.6 m Perkin Elmer | 1.6 m | 63″ | Single | Brazil | Pico dos Dias Observatory | 1981 | |
| 1.6 | 1.6 m | 63″ | R/C | Canada | Mont Mégantic Observatory, Canada | 1978 | |
| Kaj Strand Telescope | 1.55 m | 61″ | Single | USA | USN Obs. Flagstaff Station, USA | 1964 | |
| 61" Kuiper Telescope | 1.55 m | 61″ | Single | USA | Steward Obs., Mt. Bigelow, USA | 1965 | |
| Oak Ridge Observatory 61" reflector (Wyeth) | 1.55 m | 61″ | Single | USA | Oak Ridge Observatory, Massachusetts, USA | 1933–2005 | |
| Estación Astrofísica de Bosque Alegre | 1.54 m | 60.6″ | Single | Argentina | Estación Astrofísica de Bosque Alegre, Argentina | 1942 | |
| Danish 1.54 meter telescope | 1.54 m | 60.6″ | Single | Denmark | La Silla Observatory, Chile | 1979 | |
| Harvard 60-inch Reflector | 1.524 m | 60″ | Single | United States | Harvard College Observatory, USA | 1905–1931 | |
| 60-Inch Telescope | 1.524 m | 60″ | Single | United States | Mt. Wilson Observatory; California | 1908 | |
| Dunn Solar Telescope ex-VTT | 1.524 m | 60″ | Single | USA | National Solar Obs.-Sacramento Peak, USA | 1969 | |
| Palomar Observatory 60-inch | 1.524 m | 60″ | Single | USA | Palomar Observatory, California, USA | 1970 | |
| FLWO 1.5m Tillinghast | 1.52 m | 60″ | Single | United States | F. L. Whipple Obs., Arizona | 1994 | |
| Telescopio Carlos Sánchez (TCS) | 1.52 m | 60″ | Single | UK + Spain | Teide Observatory, Tenerife (Spain) | 1971 | |
| OHP 1.52 | 1.52 m | 60″ | Single | France | Haute-Provence Obs., France | 1967 | |
| Mt. Lemmon 60" Telescope | 1.52 m | 60″ | Single | USA | Steward Observatory, Mount Lemmon, USA | 1970 | |
| OAN 1.52 m | 1.52 m | 60″ | Single | Spain | Calar Alto Observatory, Spain | 1970s | |
| 152 cm G.D. Cassini | 1.52 m | 60″ | Single | Italy | Mount Orzale, Italy | 1976 | |
| TIRGO (Gornergrat Infrared Telescope) | 1.50 m | 59″ | Single IR | Italy + Switzerland | Hochalpine Forschungsstation Jungfraujoch und Gornergrat, Alps, Switzerland (3150 m) | 1979–2005 | |
| AZT-22 | 1.5 m | 59″ | Single | USSR, Uzbekistan | Mount Maidanak, Uzbekistan | 1972 | |
| AZT-20 | 1.5 m | 59″ | Single | | Assy-Turgen Observatory, Kazakhstan | | |
| AZT-12 | 1.5 m | 59″ | Single | USSR, Estonia | Tartu Observatory, Estonia | 1976 | |
| RTT-150 | 1.5 m | 59″ | Single | Russia, Turkey | TÜBİTAK National Observatory, Turkey | 2001 | |
| OSN 1.5m (Nasmyth) | 1.5 m | 59″ | Single | Spain | Sierra Nevada Obs., Spain (2896 m) | 1991 | |
| BST-1M | 1.5 m | 59″ | Single IR | USSR | Salyut 6, Earth Orbit | 1977–1982 | |
| USNOFS 1.3m | 1.3 m | 51″ | Single | USA | USN Obs. Flagstaff Station, USA | 1998 | |
| Warsaw Telescope | 1.3 m | 51″ | Single | Poland | Las Campanas Obs., Chile | 1996 | |
| Skinakas 1.3m Telescope | 1.3 m | 51'' | Single | Greece | Skinakas Obs., Greece | 1995 | |
| McGraw-Hill Telescope | 1.27 m | 50″ | Single | USA | MDM Observatory, Arizona (1975–Present); Stinchfield Woods, Michigan (1969–1975) | 1969 | |
| Great Melbourne Telescope (refit) | 127 cm | 50″ | Single | Australia | Mount Stromlo Observatory, Australia | 1961–1973; 1992–2003 | |
| AZT-11 | 1.25 m | 49″ | Single | | Abastumani Obs., Georgia (country) | 1976 | |
| AZT-11 | 1.25 m | 49″ | Single | | Crimean Astrophysical Obs., Ukraine | 1981 | |
| MPIA 1.2 | 1.23 m | 48.4″ | Single | West Germany + Spain | Calar Alto Obs., Spain | 1975 | |
| Babelsberg Zeiss | 1.22 m | 48″ | Single | Germany, USSR | Babelsberg Observatory; Berlin, Germany, Crimean Astrophysical Observatory (1952–present) | 1924 | |
| Galileo 122 cm | 1.22 m | 48″ | Single | Italy | Asiago Observatory, Italy | 1942 | |
| Samuel Oschin telescope | 1.22 m | 48″ | Schmidt | USA | Palomar Observatory; California | 1948 | |
| OHP 1.20 | 1.2 m | 48″ | Single | France | Haute-Provence Obs., France | 1943 | |
| Paris 48″ Reflector | 1.2 m | 48″ | | France | Paris Observatory, France | 1871–1943 | |
| Great Melbourne Telescope | 122 cm | 48″ | reflector – metal | Australia | Melbourne Observatory, Australia | 1878–1944 | |
| Oskar-Lühning Telescope | 1.2 m | 47″ | Single | Germany | Hamburg-Bergedorf Obs., Germany | 1975 | |
| Leonhard Euler Telescope | 120 cm | 47″ | Single | Switzerland | La Silla, Chile | 1998 | |
| Mercator Telescope | 120 cm | 47″ | Single | Belgium+Switzerland | ORM; La Palma, Canary Islands | 2001 | |
| Hamburg Robotic Telescope (HRT) | 120 cm | 47″ | Single | Germany | Hamburg-Bergedorf Obs., Germany | 2002* | |
| Hänssgen's reflector | 107 cm | 42″ | Single | Germany | Mobile (~Germany) | 2002* | |
| Omicron@C2PU | 104 cm | 41" | Single | France | Observatoire de la Côte d'Azur – Calern site, France, IAU code: 010 | 2013 | |
| Epsilon@C2PU | 104 cm | 41" | Single | France | Observatoire de la Côte d'Azur – Calern site, France, IAU code: 010 | 2015 | |
| Grubb Parsons 40-inch | 102 cm | 40″ | Single | Sweden | Stockholm Observatory in Saltsjöbaden | 1930–present | |
| Nickel Telescope | 102 cm | 40″ | Single | USA | Lick Observatory, USA | 1979 | |
| Grubb 40-inch | 102 cm | 40" | Single | USSR | Crimean Astrophysical Observatory Simeiz (destroyed in WWII) | 1925–1944 | |
| George Ritchey 40-inch (1 m) | 102 cm | 40″ | R/C | USA | Flagstaff, Arizona (Washington, D.C. until 1955), USA | 1934 | |
| Yerkes "41-inch" | 102 cm | 40″ | Single | USA | Yerkes Observatory, USA | 1968 | |
| Henrietta Swope Telescope | 102 cm | 40″ | Single | USA | Las Campanas Observatory, Chile | 1971 | |
| Meudon Observatory 1m | 100 cm | 39.4″ | Single | France | Meudon Observatory/ Paris Observatory | 1891 | |
| ZIMLAT | 100 cm | 39.4″ | Single | Switzerland | Zimmerwald Obs., Switzerland | 1997 | |
| OGS Telescope | 100 cm | 39.4″ | Single | European Space Agency countries | Teide Observatory, Tenerife, Spain | 1995 | |
| Jacobus Kapteyn Telescope | 100 cm | 39.4″ | Single | UK + Netherlands | Isaac Newton Group, Canary Islands | 1984 | |
| Lulin One-meter Telescope (LOT) | 100 cm | 39.4″ | Single | ROC (Taiwan) | Lulin Observatory, Taiwan | 2002* | |
| Zeiss di Merate (1m reflector) | 100 cm | 39.4″ | Single | Kingdom of Italy | Merate Obs., Merate, Italy | 1926 | |
| Zeiss 1m reflector | 100 cm | 39.4″ | Single | Belgium | Royal Obs., Uccle, Belgium | 1920s | |
| Hamburg Spiegelteleskop (1m reflector) | 100 cm | 39.4″ | Single | Deutsches Reich (Germany) | Hamburg-Bergedorf Obs., Germany | 1911 | |
| 1-m Carl Zeiss Jena | 100 cm | 39.4″ | Single | CCCP | Assy-Turgen Observatory, Kazakhstan | | |
| James Gregory Telescope | 94 cm | 37" | SCT | Great Britain | University of St Andrews, UK | 1962 | |
| Schmidt 92/67 cm | 92 cm | 36″ | Schmidt | Italy | Cima Ekar Observatory, Asiago, Italy (1360 m) | 1966 | |
| Kuiper Airborne Obs.(KAO) | 91.4 cm | 36″ | Single | USA | C-141 (mobile) | 1974–1995 | |
| Stratoscope 2 | 91.4 cm | 36″ | Single | USA | Balloon (mobile) | 1961–1973 | |
| Crossley Reflector | 91.4 cm | 36″ | Single | US+UK | Lick Observatory, USA | 1896 | |
| 36-inch Yapp reflector | 91.44 cm | 36″ | Reflector | UK | Greenwich & Herstmonceux | 1932 | |

This table does not include all the 20th largest mirrors manufactured; the Steward Observatory Mirror Lab produced the 6.5-metre f/1.25 collimator used in the Large Optical Test and Integration Site of Lockheed Martin, used for vacuum optical testing of other telescopes.

Segmented are also known as Mosaic mirrors. Single mirrors, also called monolithic and can be sub-categorized in types, such as solid or honeycomb.

== Selected telescopes with apertures of 90 cm (35.4 in.) and smaller ==
Some famous 20th century regionally famous telescopes, space telescopes, or otherwise significant. (100 cm = 1 meter)

| Name | Aperture m | Aper. in | Mirror/type | Nationality/Sponsors | Site | Built/Used |
|---|---|---|---|---|---|---|
| Hopkins Ultraviolet Telescope | 90 cm | 35.4" | Single UV | USA | STS, Earth Orbit | 1990, 1995 |
| Meudon Great Refractor | 83 cm | 32.67" | refractor (visual) | France | Meudon, France | 1891 |
| 83-cm Reflector, Toulouse Observatory | 83 cm | 32.67" | reflector-glass | France | Toulouse, France | 1875 |
| Focault 80 cm, Marseille Observatory | 80 cm | 31.5" | reflector-glass | Focault | Marseille, France | 1862–1965 |
| Astron | 80 cm | 31.5" | Single UV | CCCP + France | Earth orbit | 1983–1989 |
| Potsdam Great Refractor (double refractor) | 80 cm | 31.5" | Doublet | Germany | Potsdam, Germany | 1899 |
| Ruisinger | 76.2 cm | 30" | Single-Newtonian | United States (ASKC) | Louisburg, Kansas – Powell Obs. | 1985 |
| Greenwich 28-inch refractor Royal Observatory, Greenwich | 71 cm | 28" | Doublet | British Empire | Greenwich, England; Herstmonceux, England, UK | 1893 |
| Meudon Great Refractor | 62 cm | | refractor (photographic-blue) | France | Meudon, France | 1891 |
| Infrared Space Observatory | 60 cm | 23.5" | IR (2.4-240 μm) | European Space Agency | Earth orbit (GEO) | 1995–1998 |
| IRAS | 57 cm | 22.44" | R/C IR | US + UK + The Netherlands | Earth orbit | 1983 |
| Mons Telescope | 50 cm | 19.7" | Single | Belgium | Teide Observatory, Tenerife (Spain) | 1972 |
| Dutch Open Telescope (DOT) | 45 cm | 17.7" | Solar | Denmark | ORM, Canary Islands | 1997 |
| Explorer 57 (IUE) | 45 cm | 17.7" | Single UV | US+UK+ESA Countries | Earth orbit (GEO) | 1978–1996 |
| Glazar UV telescope | 40 cm | 15.75" | Single UV | CCCP | Kvant-1 (Mir), Earth Orbit | 1987–2001 |
| Glazar 2 UV telescope | 40 cm | 15.75" | Single UV | CCCP + Switzerland | Kristall (Mir), Earth Orbit | 1990–2001 |
| Mars Global Surveyor—MOC | 35 cm | 13.8" | R/C | USA | Mars Orbit | 1996–2006 |
| Griffith Observatory 12-inch Zeiss refractor | 30.5 cm | 12" | Achromat | USA | L.A., USA | 1931 |
| XMM-Newton—UV camera | 30 cm | 11.9" | Single UV | ESA Countries | Earth orbit | 1998 |
| TRACE | 30 cm | 11.9" | Single EUV/UV/Vis | NASA | Earth orbit | 1998–2010 |
| Hipparcos | 29 cm | 11.4" | Schmidt | European Space Agency | Earth orbit (GTO) | 1989–1993 |
| Astronomical Netherlands Satellite | 22 cm | 8.7" | Single UV | Nederlands & USA | Earth Orbit | 1974–1976 |
| Galileo – Solid State Imager | 17.65 cm | 6.95" | Reflector | USA | Jupiter | 1989–2003 |
| Voyager 1/2, ISS-NAC | 17.6 cm | 6.92" | Catadioptric | USA | Space | 1977 |
| Spacelab IRT | 15.2 cm | 6" | IR (1.7–118 μm) | ESA + NASA | STS, Earth Orbit | 1985 |
| Mariner 10 – TV Photo. (x2) | 15 cm | 5.9" | Reflector | USA | Space | 1973–1975 |
| Deep Space 1—MICAS | 10 cm | 3.94" | Single | USA | Solar Orbit | 1998–2001 |
| Far Ultraviolet Camera/Spectrograph | 7.62 cm | 3" | Schmidt UV | USA | Lunar surface | 1972 |
| Voyager 1/2, ISS-WAC | 6 cm | 2.36" | Lens | USA | Space | 1977 |

At the end of the 20th century preliminary designs for extremely large telescope of the 21st century were being worked on, as well as many smaller telescopes such as the Large Binocular Telescope

== Under Construction ==
Examples of telescopes that were started in the 20th century, but may only have achieved a preliminary level of construction by the turn of the century.

| Name/Observatory | Aperture m | Aper. in | Mirror type | Nationality of Sponsors | Site and/or Observatory | FL or Built | |
|---|---|---|---|---|---|---|
| GTC | 10.4 m | 409" | Segmented,36 | Spain (90%), Mexico(5%), USA(5%) | Roque de los Muchachos Observatory, La Palma | 2007 |
| Faulkes Telescope North | 2 m | 79" | Single | UK | Haleakala Observatory, Hawaii, USA | 2003 |

== See also ==
- List of largest optical telescopes in the 19th century
- List of largest optical telescopes in the 18th century
- Lists of telescopes
- List of largest optical reflecting telescopes
- List of optical telescopes
  - List of large optical telescopes
- List of largest optical telescopes historically
- List of astronomical interferometers at visible and infrared wavelengths
