= Horace Dall =

English astronomer and inventor (1901–1986)

- Dall with a cat and a folding telescope, 1980
- Born: Horace Edward Stafford Dall; 5 January 1901; Chelmsford, England
- Died: 9 May 1986 (aged 85); Luton, England
- Known for: telescope design

Horace Edward Stafford Dall (5 January 1901 – 9 May 1986) was an English amateur astronomer, optician, telescope and microscope maker and inventor.

== Biography ==
Horace Dall was born on 5 January 1901, in Chelmsford, England. His father worked for Guglielmo Marconi; his mother died when he was three. After that, Dall lived at multiple addresses, moving twelve times before the age of six, until his father remarried and moved to Luton. Dall excelled at science and maths at school, and started to work for the aircraft manufacturer Hewlett & Blondeau at 14. He worked there for three years at a drawing office. Dall became interested in astronomy and got his first telescope, which he soon upgraded by himself. At 16, he bought a used microscope, and a year later a camera obscura. Dall enrolled at the night-school of the Luton Technical College, and in 1918 he joined George Kent Ltd, a water meter manufacturer. He spent his whole career there working in the Research and Development department, retiring in 1965. Among his inventions is a Dall tube for flow measurement. E. J. Hysom wrote later that in the field of water engineering the name "Dall" is "as famous as 'Hoover' in vacuum cleaning".

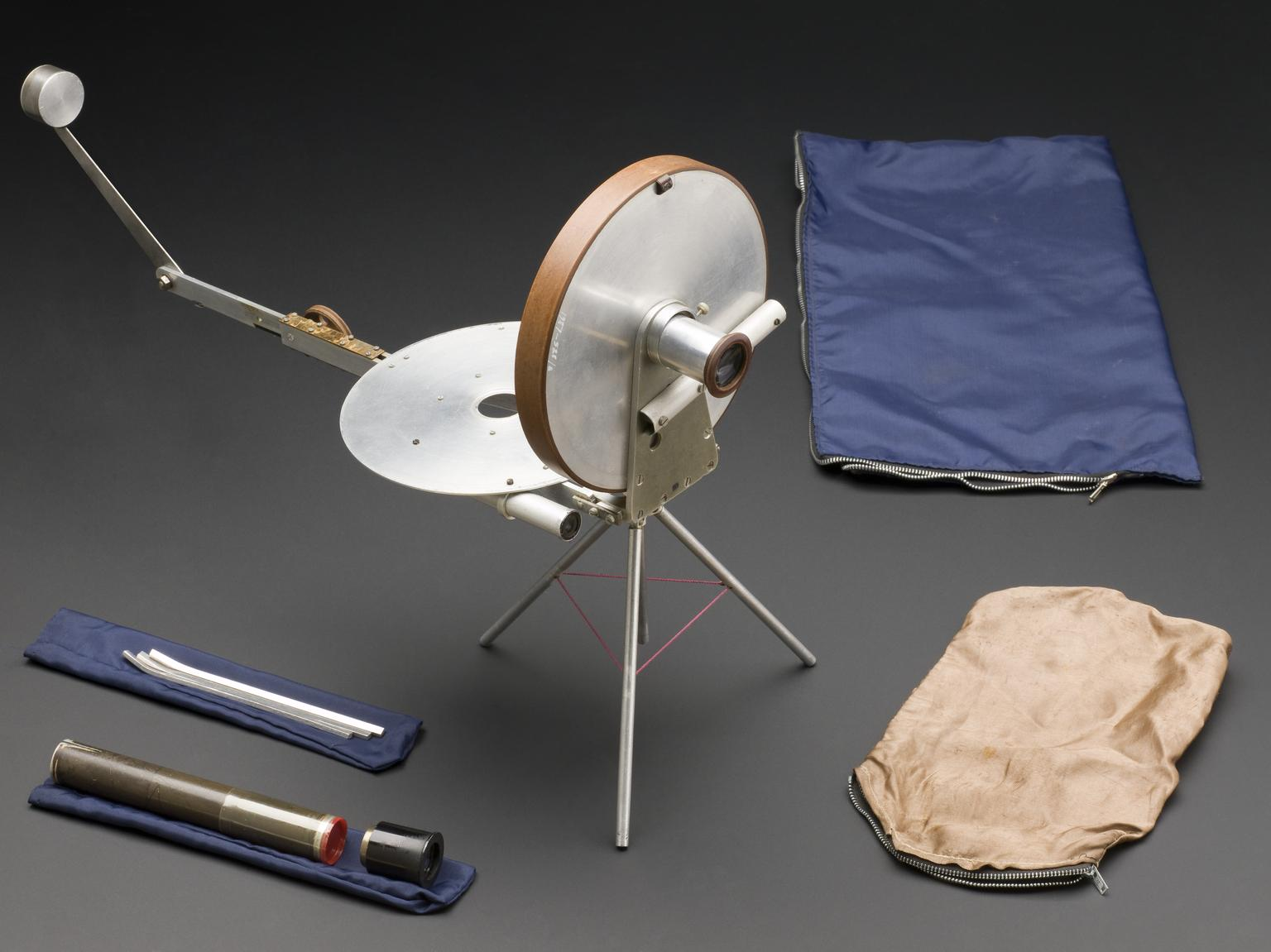
Foldable Dall-Kirkham reflecting telescope, made by Dall

In 1925 Dall "started making optics" and joined the British Astronomical Association (BAA). He worked on both telescopes and microscopes, and made multiple telescope eyepieces of high quality. In the early 1930s, he made a Cassegrain telescope with spherical rather than hyperboloidal lenses. It became the basis of a portable telescope that Dall was developing; now it is known as the Dall-Kirkham reflecting telescope. When Dall learned about "an Englishman" who was able to engrave "letters so small the content of 5 bibles could be fitted to the square inch", he developed a technique to engrave even smaller letters; after several improvements he was able to reach "280 bibles/square inch". It was a world record, later included in The Guinness Book of World Records:

During the mid 1950s, Horace Dall of Luton, England built a pantograph – which reduces movement – fitted with a diamond stylus, with which he engraved writing small enough to fit 140 Bibles to one square inch. In the 1990s, the movement of small atoms under an electron microscope now allows engraving of letters five atoms tall. At this size, several Bibles could be printed on a single bacterium.

According to Hysom, Dall set several more world records: inventing "the most accurate spherometer (a mechanical device capable of detecting a change in shape as small as 1/40 the wavelength of visible light)", a barometer "capable of showing a change when raised or lowered the height of a thick book", creating lenses from diamonds and using them as microscope objectives, "achieving a numerical aperture of 1.92".

During the war, Dall repaired German-made Leitz microscopes in London, manufacturing optics that were previously made by a German company. Using a camera obscura, Dall "spotted exploding bombs" and calculated impact positions. He then joined the British team that studied German V-2 rockets; after the war he was sent to Peenemünde, where he helped to assemble a rocket for a test flight.

After the war, Dall invented his own version of a Maksutov telescope, which he then incorporated into his portable telescope. Dall was a consultant for British telescope manufacturers, and helped multiple amateur astronomers. He refused to become BAA President, but served on its council, and was a vice-president on several sessions.

Dall was "a great advocate" of null tests; he developed a modification of the Foucault knife-edge test, now known as the Dall null test.

Biologist Brian J. Ford wrote that Dall gave him a microscope with "a magnification of 295x, similar to the best of Leeuwenhoek's home-made microscopes"; he used it for Giardia research. Dall also introduced a "visibility index" in microscopy, "to quantify refractive index differences".

== Personal life ==
Dall built a 390 mm Cassegrain telescope at his home, and used it for lunar and planetary photography. British amateur astronomer Martin Mobberley called him "the King of UK planetary photography" and an "optical genius".

Dall was fond of hiking and cycling; he spent many winters in Switzerland. He once made a "19-day trip cycling across the North Cape and down into Lappland". He also travelled to the Middle East, crossed the High Atlas Mountains on a bicycle in 1930, where he was arrested for spying and rescued by the French Foreign Legion, and the Sahara desert. In 1932, Dall attempted to cross Iceland on a bicycle, but was able to finish only 20% of the route. In 1933, he crossed Iceland's Sprengisandur; he took only glucose, pemmican, and a sleeping bag, but had no tent. He cycled until his 50s.

In 1934, Dall married Vivien Andrews; they had no children. Vivien died in 1964. He retired in 1965; in the same year, he flew to Australia, where he bought a Vespa scooter, and "rode all the way round the continent". In 1968 Dall travelled to South America, and met Helena Thurley in Patagonia, whom he soon married. They continued to travel together, to Africa, Himalayas, Americas, and went to a trans-Siberian trip to Mongolia.

Dall died on 9 May 1986 from a sudden stroke while repairing a microscope.

== Awards ==
- 1967 Walter Goodacre Medal of the BAA
- 1977 Callender Silver Medal from the Institute of Measurement and Control

In 1988, BAA inaugurated the Horace Dall Medal and Gift: "The award shall be made to a person, whether or not a member of the Association, who has shown marked ability in the making of Astronomical Instruments."

== Selected publications ==
- Dall, H. E. (1947). "A null test for paraboloids". Journal of the British Astronomical Association. 57 (5): 201–205.
- Dall, H. E. (1965). "Visual Astronomy in the Ultra-Violet". Journal of the British Astronomical Association. 75: 317–320.
- Dall, H. E. (1967). "Filter Type Solar Prominence Telescope for Amateurs". Journal of the British Astronomical Association. 77: 94–101. Bibcode:1967JBAA...77...94D. ISSN 0007-0297.
- Dall, H. E. (1969). "Astronomical Objects for Southern Telescopes". Physics Bulletin. 20 (3): 108. doi:10.1088/0031-9112/20/3/023.
- Dall, H. E. (1969). "Telescope eyepieces". Journal of the British Astronomical Association. 79: 349. Bibcode:1969JBAA...79..349D.
- Dall, H. E. (1972). "Finding and guiding on dark skies". Journal of the British Astronomical Association. 82: 202. Bibcode:1972JBAA...82..202D.
- Dall, H. E. (1975). "George Calver - east Anglian telescope maker". Journal of the British Astronomical Association. 86: 49. Bibcode:1975JBAA...86...49D.
- Dall, H. E.; Whippey, M. R. (1979). "Filter type solar prominence telescope for amateurs". Journal of the British Astronomical Association. 89: 122. Bibcode:1979JBAA...89..122D.
- Dall, H. E.; Hysom, E. J.; Ronan, C. A. (1980). "A Dollond / Wollaston Telescope". Journal of the British Astronomical Association. 90: 422.

Multiple articles are reprinted in the I&I News 2011.
