= Large Optical Test and Integration Site =

Optical component testing facility in California

The Large Optical Test and Integration Site, or LOTIS, is a facility at the Lockheed Martin Space Systems Company in Sunnyvale, CA for testing large optical components under realistic conditions. LOTIS has large, thermally stabilized vacuum chamber, vibration-isolated optical benches, and a large 6.5 meter telescope (run backwards as a collimator) to create images for the test optics to view. It can generate images from the visible through the mid-wavelength IR.

The fabrication error in the Hubble Space Telescope main mirror is the classic example that shows the need for such testing. In this case, a test facility such as LOTIS was not easily available, so the completed optics were not tested as a unit, and instead relied on careful testing of the individual components. Unfortunately, due to a mis-assembled null corrector, one of the tests was wrong, and a mis-figured mirror was not discovered until the telescope was placed into service. This is exactly the type of problem that LOTIS can detect, since it is designed to test large optical systems as a unit by creating realistic inputs and operating conditions for them.
