= Ronchi (name) =

Ronchi is both a given name and a surname. People with the name include:

== Surname ==
- Andrea Ronchi (born 1955), Italian politician
- Edo Ronchi (born 1950), Italian engineer and politician
- Luke Ronchi (born 1981), New Zealand cricketer
- Pellegrino Tomaso Ronchi (1930–2018), Italian bishop
- Sophie de Ronchi (born 1985), French swimmer
- Enrico Ronchi (born 1984), scientist
- Vasco Ronchi (1897–1988), Italian physicist known for his work in optics

== Given name ==
- Ronchi Isa (1917–2005), Lebanese politician of the Netherlands Antilles
