= Yerkes 41-inch reflector =

40-inch aperture reflecting telescope at the Yerkes Observatory

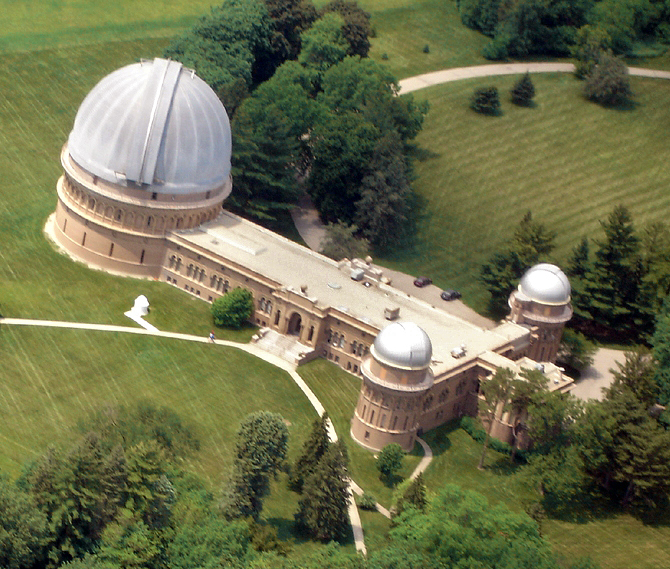
Yerkes Observatory; the 41-inch reflector is in the front (southern) dome.

Yerkes 41-inch reflector is a 40-inch aperture (101.6 cm) reflecting telescope at the Yerkes Observatory, that was completed in 1968. It is known as the 41 inch to avoid confusion with a 40-inch refractor at the observatory. Optically it is a Ritchey–Chrétien design, and the main mirror uses low expansion glass. The telescope was used as a testbed for an adaptive optics system in the 1990s.

== History ==
In the late 1960s a 40-inch reflecting telescope was added, often called the "41 inch" reflector, and in 2002 it was given a new dome over it. The 41 inch was finished by 1968, with overall installation completed by December 1967 and the optics in 1968. The telescope had a clear aperture of 40 inches, but was often called the "41 inch" so it would not be confused with the Yerkes 40 inch refractor. Also, the physical diameter of the mirror was 41 inches, even though optical clear aperture was smaller.

The 40 inch reflector was of the Ritchey–Chrétien optical design. It systems and the figuring of the glass was mostly completed at the Optical workshop of the Yerkes Observatory. However, the mirror was completed by Tinsley Laboratories, because the person (A graduate student) working on the mirror died unexpectedly. The mirror had a physical diameter of 104 cm and was made from Cer-Vit low-expansion glass. In the 21st century, the 41 inch was placed on the robotic Skynet telescope network, along with a 24-inch telescope at Yerkes.

The telescope is one of three major instruments at the Observatory in the late 20th and 21st century, along with 40-inch refractor and 24-inch reflector; these three telescopes occupy the 3 main telescope domes of the building.

The 41 inch was installed in the southern dome, replacing the old 24-inch (2 foot ) reflecting telescope that dated to the turn of the century. The northern dome housed the new 24 inch, which replaced the Kenwood 12-inch refractor. Both of these domes are on the eastern side of the building along with the meridian transit room. The south-east dome has a diameter of about 30 feet, and was originally designed for 14-inch refractor in the 1890s.

== Instruments ==
The launch instruments for the 41 inch reflector included:

- Image tube spectrograph
- Photoelectric photometer
- Photoelectric spectrophotometer
- Photographic plate camera

The telescope was often used as a testbed for a device known as the Wavefront Control Experiment in the 1990s. This was an adaptive optics system that used a deformable mirror to reduce the blurring caused by disturbances in the atmosphere of Earth. One application was the study of combining adoptive optics with fiber optics for high-accuracy spectrographs. That type of data, given enough accuracy can be used to detect exoplanets by doppler shift.

== See also ==
- List of largest optical telescopes in the 20th century
- List of telescope types
