= 1951 USAF resolution test chart =

Microscopic optical resolution test device

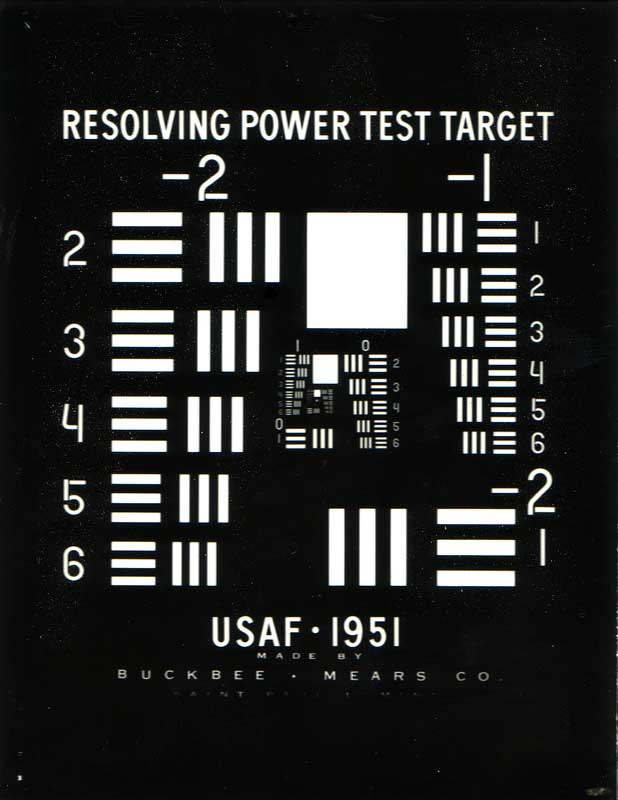
Glass chart

A 1951 USAF resolution test chart is a microscopic optical resolution test device originally defined by the U.S. Air Force MIL-STD-150A standard of 1951. The design provides numerous small target shapes exhibiting a stepped assortment of precise spatial frequency specimens. It is widely used in optical engineering laboratory work to analyze and validate imaging systems such as microscopes, cameras and image scanners.

The full standard pattern consists of 9 groups, with each group consisting of 6 elements; thus there are 54 target elements provided in the full series. Each element consists of three bars which form a minimal Ronchi ruling. These 54 elements are provided in a standardized series of logarithmic steps in the spatial frequency range from 0.250 to 912.3 line pairs per millimeter (lp/mm). The series of elements spans the range of resolution of the unaided eye, down to the diffraction limits of conventional light microscopy.

Commercially produced devices typically consist of a transparent square glass slide, 2 inches or 50 mm in dimension. The slide is printed in metallic chromium by photolithography with the standard pattern, photographically reduced from a large master plot. Slides are available as photographic positive or negative prints to best fit the illumination technique used in various testing methods. A less expensive, abbreviated version omits the two tiniest groups at the center of the pattern (groups number 8 and 9), since the lithography at that scale is costly, and the group elements represent resolution beyond the design of many imaging applications.

The lateral spatial resolution of an imaging system is measured by identifying the smallest element where there are still three distinct peaks (a minimum level of contrast can be specified to give an accordingly more conservative value, but this is not a requirement of the original MIL-STD-150A standard) in the system's image of the slide. The approximate full width at half maximum of the imaging point spread function, and distance two point objects of equal intensity can be distinguished (with a minima in signal between), is given by the grating period (a.k.a. line pair width) not the single line width.

This element's label is noted by the observer (each group, and each element within a group, is labeled with a single digit). This pair of digits indicates a given element's row and column location in the series table, which in turn defines the spatial frequency of each element, and thus the available resolution of the system.

An analytical characterization of resolution as the modulation transfer function is available by plotting the observed image contrast as a function of the various element spatial frequencies. Optical aberrations in the imaging system are readily detected and characterized by translating and rotating the elements within the imaging system's field of view.

== Pattern format ==
The common MIL-STD-150A format consists of six groups in a compact spiral arrangement of three layers. The largest two groups, forming the first layer, are located on the outer sides. The smaller layers consist of repeating progressively smaller pairs toward the center. Each group consists of six elements, numbered from 1 to 6. Within the same layer, the odd-numbered groups appear contiguously from 1 through 6 from the upper right corner. The first element of the even-numbered groups is at the lower right of the layer, with the remaining 2 through 6, at the left. The scales and dimensions of the bars are given by the expression

$$\text{resolution (lp/mm)} = 2^{\text{group} + (\text{element} - 1)/6},$$

although usually the following lookup table will be more convenient to use. The line pair (lp) means a black and a white line.

Number of line pairs per millimeter in USAF Resolving Power Test Target 1951
	Group number											
Element	−2	−1	0	1	2	3	4	5	6	7	8	9
1	0.250	0.500	1.00	2.00	4.00	8.00	16.00	32.0	64.0	128.0	256.0	512.0
2	0.281	0.561	1.12	2.24	4.49	8.98	17.96	35.9	71.8	143.7	287.4	574.7
3	0.315	0.630	1.26	2.52	5.04	10.08	20.16	40.3	80.6	161.3	322.5	645.1
4	0.354	0.707	1.41	2.83	5.66	11.31	22.63	45.3	90.5	181.0	362.0	724.1
5	0.397	0.794	1.59	3.17	6.35	12.70	25.40	50.8	101.6	203.2	406.4	812.7
6	0.445	0.891	1.78	3.56	7.13	14.25	28.51	57.0	114.0	228.1	456.1	912.3

Width of a line in micrometers in USAF Resolving Power Test Target 1951
	Group number											
Element	−2	−1	0	1	2	3	4	5	6	7	8	9
1	2000.00	1000.00	500.00	250.00	125.00	62.50	31.25	15.63	7.81	3.91	1.95	0.98
2	1781.80	890.90	445.45	222.72	111.36	55.68	27.84	13.92	6.96	3.48	1.74	0.87
3	1587.40	793.70	396.85	198.43	99.21	49.61	24.80	12.40	6.20	3.10	1.55	0.78
4	1414.21	707.11	353.55	176.78	88.39	44.19	22.10	11.05	5.52	2.76	1.38	0.69
5	1259.92	629.96	314.98	157.49	78.75	39.37	19.69	9.84	4.92	2.46	1.23	0.62
6	1122.46	561.23	280.62	140.31	70.15	35.08	17.54	8.77	4.38	2.19	1.10	0.55

== Images ==
USAF-1951 map, vector format

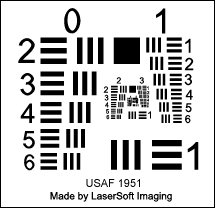
SilverFast USAF 1951 Resolution Target by LaserSoft Imaging

== See also ==
- USAF 1951 target section, in optical resolution
