= Modified Dall–Kirkham telescope =

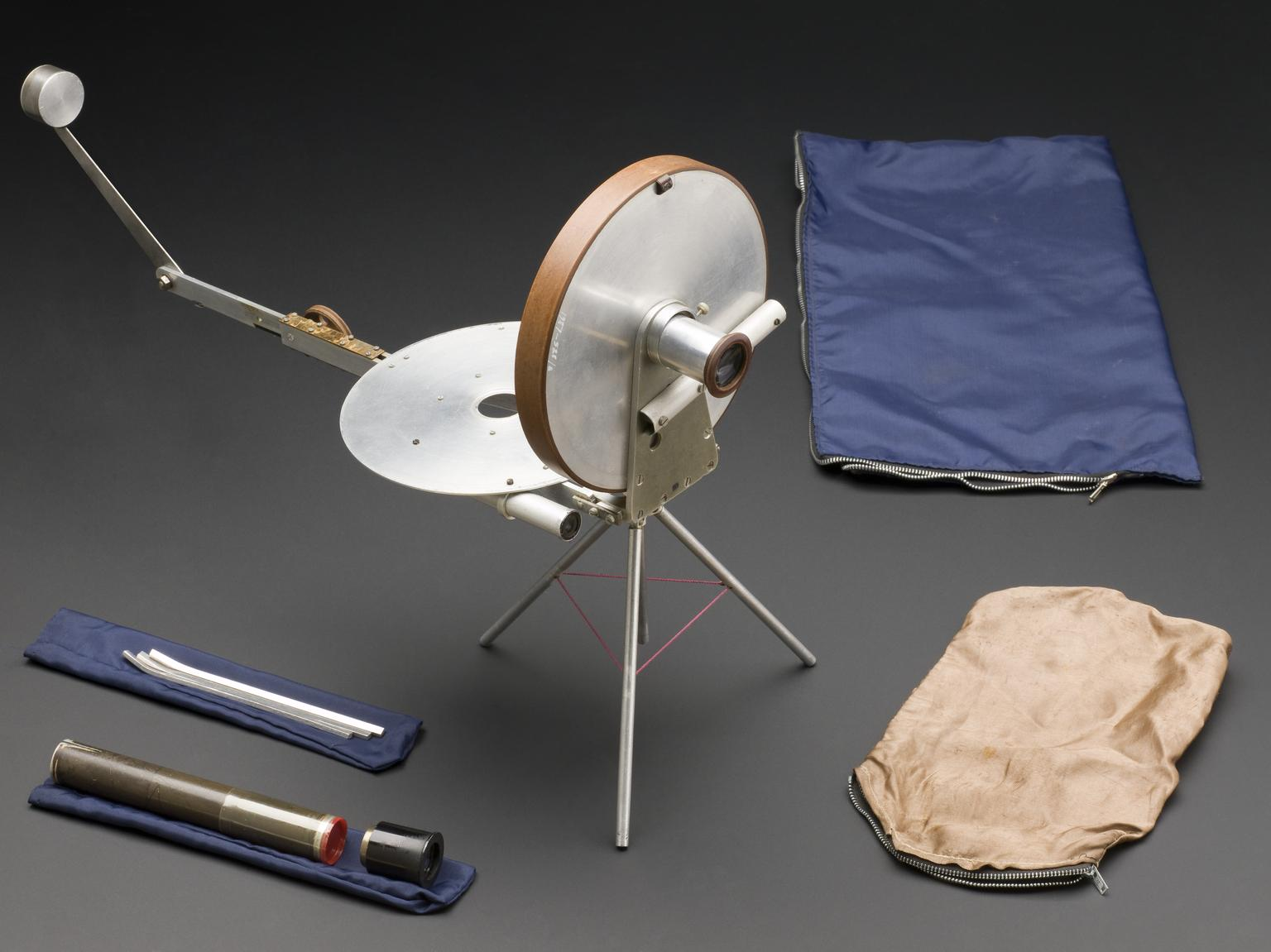
Dall-Kirkham reflecting telescope, built by Horace Edward Dall

The Modified Dall–Kirkham telescope uses an elliptical primary and spherical secondary mirror as in the conventional Dall-Kirkham configuration, but also includes a lens group (usually two or three lens elements) ahead of the focal point to improve off-axis image quality. The primary mirror conic constant is slightly different from that for a conventional Dall-Kirkham and must be optimized along with the lenses during design. The usable field is much better than that of the Ritchey-Chrétien telescope without corrector, even over very wide spectral bands, typically 380 to 950 nanometres (edges of UV-A and near infrared) if the corrector is made of quartz. (With a corrector, the Ritchey-Chrétien System also has a better and bigger field.)

Such a telescope was designed by Rosin and Wynne after World War II. The performance is equal to or better than that of the Ritchey-Chrétien telescope. The spherical secondary can be fringe tested against a spherical concave surface or tested from behind. This is markedly an advantage over the hyperbolic secondary of the Ritchey-Chrétien design.

Another advantage of either the basic Dall-Kirkham or the Modified Dall-Kirkham design is that collimation of the convex spherical secondary mirror with respect to the optical axis of the primary mirror is almost trivial, because there is no single defined axis of a sphere. Any line that runs through the center of the sphere can be an axis.

== See also ==
- List of telescope types
- Horace Dall
