= Foucault knife-edge test =

Optical test for curved mirrors

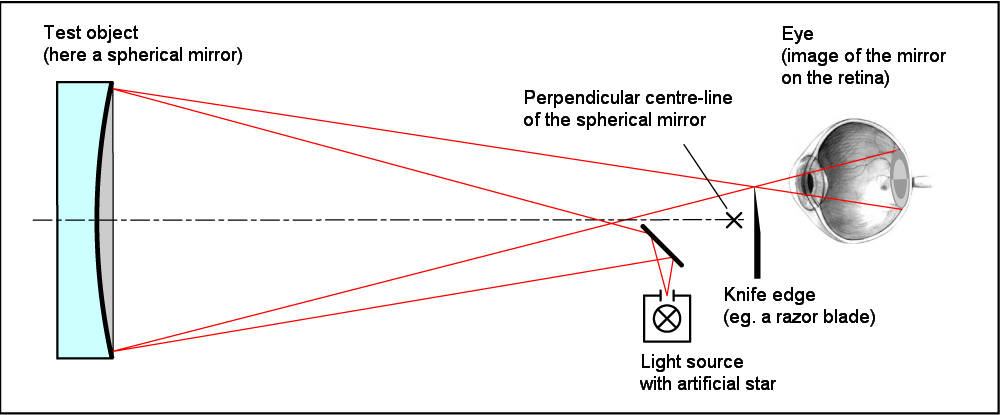
Foucault test setup to measure a mirror

The Foucault knife-edge test is an optical test to accurately measure the shape of concave curved mirrors. It is commonly used by amateur telescope makers for figuring primary mirrors in reflecting telescopes. It uses a relatively simple, inexpensive apparatus compared to other testing techniques.

== Overview ==
The Foucault knife-edge test was described in 1858 by French physicist Léon Foucault as a way to measure conic shapes of optical mirrors. It measures mirror surface dimensions by reflecting light into a knife edge at or near the mirror's centre of curvature. In doing so, it only needs a tester which in its most basic 19th century form consists of a light bulb, a piece of tinfoil with a pinhole in it, and a razor blade to create the knife edge. The testing device is adjustable along the X-axis (knife cut direction) across the Y-axis (optical axis), and is usually equipped with measurable adjustment to 0.001 inch (25 μm) or better along lines parallel to the optical axis. The test can measure errors in a mirror's curvature to fractions of wavelengths of light (or Angstroms, millionths of an inch, or nanometers).

== Foucault test basics ==
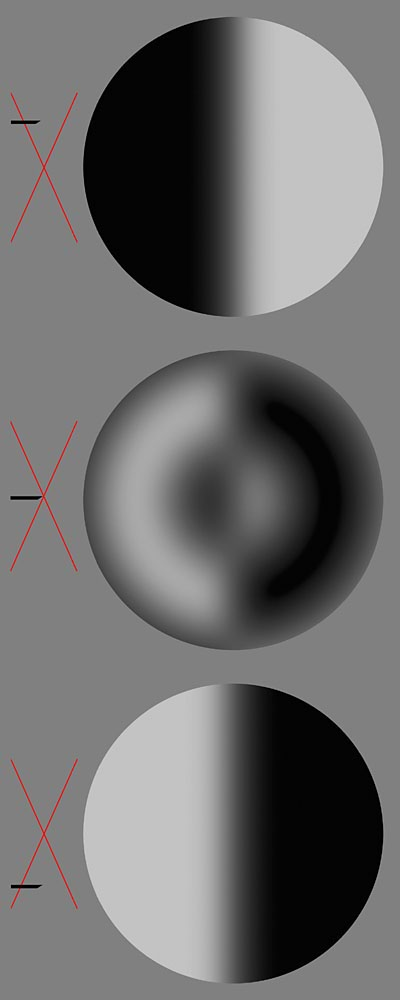
From top: Parabolic mirror showing Foucault shadow patterns made by knife edge inside radius of curvature R (red X), at R and outside R.

Foucault testing is commonly used by amateur telescope makers for figuring primary mirrors in reflecting telescopes. The mirror to be tested is placed vertically in a stand. The Foucault tester is set up at the distance of the mirror's radius of curvature (radius R is twice the focal length.) with the pinhole to one side of the centre of curvature (a short vertical slit parallel to the knife edge can be used instead of the pinhole). The tester is adjusted so that the returning beam from the pinhole light source is interrupted by the knife edge.

Viewing the mirror from behind the knife edge shows a pattern on the mirror surface. If the mirror surface is part of a perfect sphere, the mirror appears evenly lighted across the entire surface. If the mirror is spherical but with defects such as bumps or depressions, the defects appear greatly magnified in height. If the surface is paraboloidal, the mirror usually looks like a doughnut or lozenge although the exact appearance depends on the exact position of the knife edge.

It is possible to calculate how closely the mirror surface resembles a perfect parabola by placing a Couder mask, Everest pin stick (after A. W. Everest) or other zone marker over the mirror. A series of measurements with the tester finds the radii of curvature of the zones along the optical axis of the mirror (Y-axis). These data are then reduced and graphed against an ideal parabolic curve.

=== Other testing techniques ===
A number of other tests are used which measure the mirror at the center of curvature. Some telescope makers use a variant of the Foucault test called a Ronchi test that replaces the knife edge with a grating (similar to a very coarse diffraction grating) comprising fine parallel wires, an etching on a glass plate, a photographic negative or computer printed transparency. Ronchi test patterns are matched to those of standard mirrors or generated by computer.

Other variants of the Foucault test include the Gaviola or Caustic test which can measure mirrors of fast f/ratio more accurately than the Foucault test which is limited to about (λ/8) wavelength accuracy on small and medium-sized mirrors. The Caustic test is capable of measuring larger mirrors and achieving a (λ/20) wave peak to valley accuracy by using a testing stage which is adjusted from side to side so as to measure each zone of each side of the mirror from the center of its curvature.

The Dall null test uses a plano-convex lens placed a short distance in front of the pinhole. With the correct positioning of the lens, a parabolic mirror appears flat under testing instead of doughnut-shaped so testing is much easier and zonal measurements are not needed. It was invented by Horace Dall.

There are a number of interferometric tests which have been used including the Michelson-Twyman and the Michelson method, both published in 1918, the Lenouvel method and the Fizeau method. Interferometric testing has been made more affordable in recent years by affordable lasers, digital cameras (such as webcams), and computers, but remains primarily an industrial methodology.

== See also ==
- Schlieren photography
- Airy disk
- Amateur telescope making
- Angular resolution (see Angular resolution#Explanation for discussion of the Rayleigh criterion)
- Diffraction-limited system
- Huygens–Fresnel principle#Single slit diffraction
- Fabrication and testing of optical components
- Null corrector
- Strehl ratio
