= Ronchi test =

In optical testing a Ronchi test is a method of determining the surface shape (figure) of a mirror used in telescopes and other optical devices.

== Description ==
In 1923 Italian physicist Vasco Ronchi published a description of the eponymous Ronchi test, which is a variation of the Foucault knife-edge test and which uses simple equipment to test the quality of optics, especially concave mirrors. . A "Ronchi tester" consists of:

- A light source
- A diffuser
- A Ronchi grating

A Ronchi grating consists of alternate dark and clear stripes. One design is a small frame with several evenly spaced fine wires attached.

Light is emitted through the Ronchi grating (or a single slit), reflected by the mirror being tested, then passes through the Ronchi grating again and is observed by the person doing the test. The observer's eye is placed close to the centre of curvature of the mirror under test looking at the mirror through the grating. The Ronchi grating is a short distance (less than 2 cm) closer to the mirror.

The observer sees the mirror covered in a pattern of stripes that reveal the shape of the mirror. The pattern is compared to a mathematically generated diagram (usually done on a computer today) of what it should look like for a given figure. Inputs to the program are line frequency of the Ronchi grating, focal length and diameter of the mirror, and the figure required. If the mirror is spherical, the pattern consists of straight lines.

== Applications ==
The Ronchi test is used in the testing of mirrors for reflecting telescopes especially in the field of amateur telescope making. It is much faster to set up than the standard Foucault knife-edge test.

The Ronchi test differs from the knife-edge test, requiring a specialized target (the Ronchi grating, which amounts to a periodic series of knife edges) and being more difficult to interpret. This procedure offers a quick evaluation of the mirror's shape and condition. It readily identifies a 'turned edge' (rolled down outer diameter of the mirror), a common fault that can develop in objective mirror making.

The figure quality of a convex lens may be visually tested using a similar principle. The grating is moved around the focal point of the lens while viewing the virtual image through the opposite side. Distortions in the lens surface figure then appear as asymmetries in the periodic grating image.
