= Vasco Ronchi =

Italian physicist

Vasco Ronchi (Italian: [ˈvasko ˈroŋki]; 19 December 1897 – 31 October 1988) was an Italian physicist known for his work in optics. He was born on 19 December 1897 in Florence, Italy. Along with Enrico Fermi, he was a student of Luigi Puccianti. He studied at the Faculty of Physics of the University of Pisa from 1915 to 1919.

In 1922, Ronchi published work describing testing methods for optics using simple equipment. The Ronchi test is widely used in amateur telescope making. The Ronchi ruling also bears his name.

He served numerous terms as the President of the 'Union Internationale d'Histoire des Sciences' within the UNESCO.

Ronchi authored 900 papers and 30 books.
