= New Technology Telescope =

Astronomical telescope in Chile

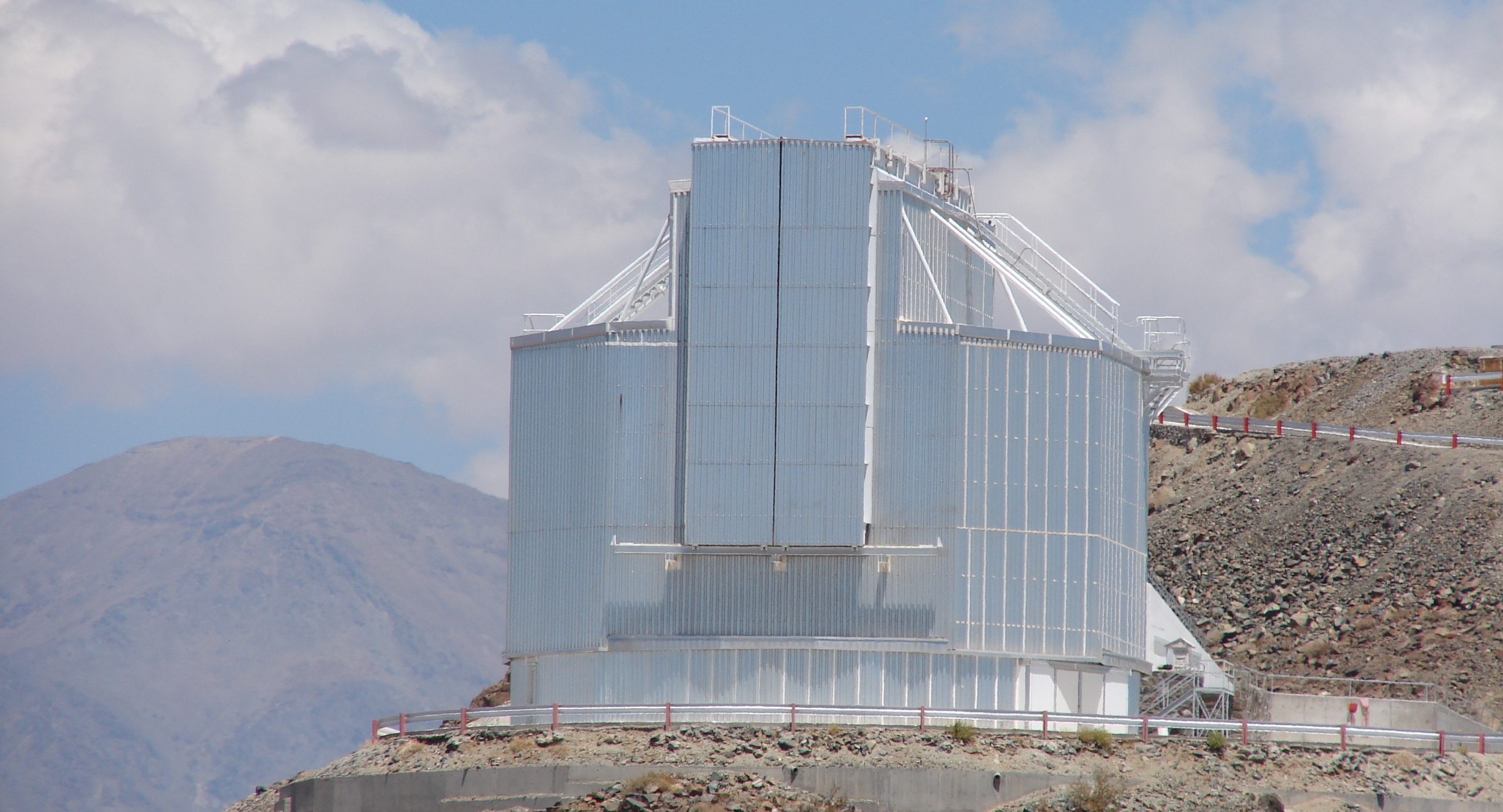
- Alternative names: NTT
- Location(s): Atacama Desert
- Coordinates: 29°15′32″S 70°44′01″W
- Altitude: 2,375 m (7,792 ft)
- First light: March 1989
- Telescope style: Ritchey–Chrétien telescope
- Diameter: 3.58 m (11 ft 9 in)
- Secondary diameter: 0.875 m (2 ft 10.4 in)
- Website: www.eso.org/sci/facilities/lasilla/telescopes/ntt.html
- Location of New Technology Telescope
- Related media on Commons

The New Technology Telescope or NTT is a 3.58-metre Ritchey–Chrétien telescope operated by the European Southern Observatory. It began operations in 1989. It is located in Chile at the La Silla Observatory and was an early pioneer in the use of active optics. The telescope and its enclosure were built to a revolutionary design for optimal image quality.

== Characteristics ==
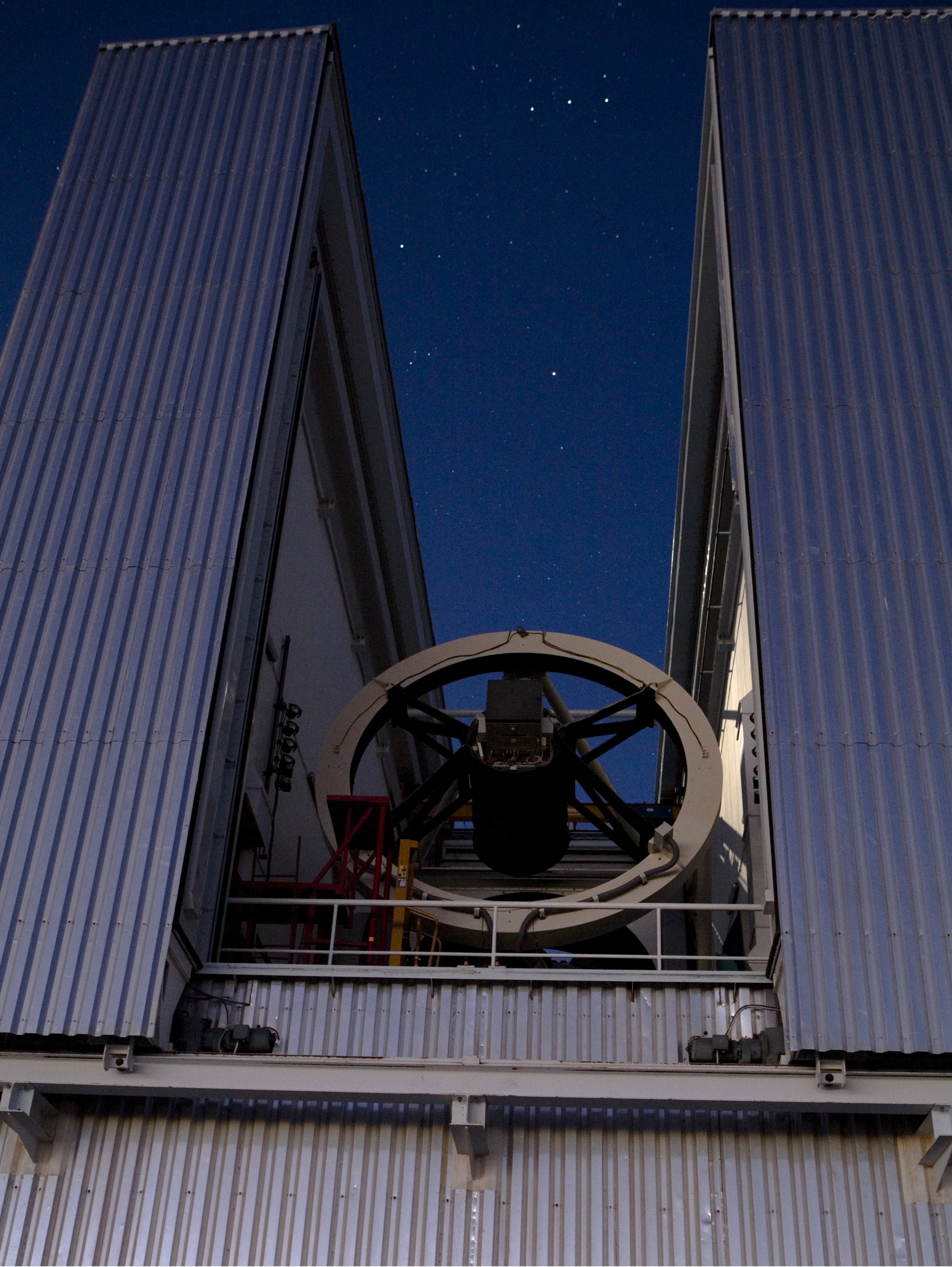
ESO's New Technology Telescope at La Silla

The main mirror of NTT is flexible and its shape is actively adjusted during observations by actuators to preserve the optimal image quality. The secondary mirror position is also actively controlled in three directions. This technology, developed by ESO, known as active optics, is now applied to all major modern telescopes, such as the Very Large Telescope at Cerro Paranal and the future European Extremely Large Telescope. The design of the octagonal enclosure housing the NTT is another technological breakthrough. The telescope dome is relatively small, and is ventilated by a system of flaps that makes air flow smoothly across the mirror, reducing turbulence and leading to sharper images.

The NTT was the first telescope using what is now known as active optics: a feedback loop that actively keeps the (comparatively thin) monolithic mirror in shape, using numerous actuators on which the mirror is mounted.

Its design as well as the design of its enclosure (the building protecting it) included many revolutionary features, from whence it was named. In particular, great care was taken to ensure a good ventilation of the telescope, and to avoid heat sources in around the telescope. Since its construction, the NTT has undergone several upgrades which continued to improve its quality. It was used as a real-life test bench for the engineering concepts and software used for the Very Large Telescope.

The New Technology Telescope initially had the same problem as the Hubble Space Telescope – the mirror was ground to the wrong shape due to a mis-calibrated null corrector. However, the active optics system of the NTT was able to correct that error without refiguring the mirror.

== Instruments ==
Currently, the NTT is equipped with 2 instruments:

- SofI ("Son of ISAAC", a VLT instrument), a near infrared camera and low-resolution spectrograph, with polarimetric and high-time resolution modes
- EFOSC2 (ESO Faint Object Spectrograph and Camera, v.2), a visible light camera and low-resolution spectrograph, with multi-object spectroscopy, polarimetry and coronography modes

== Science with the NTT ==
The NTT and its instrument have contributed for important discoveries since the telescope started working at La Silla. These include unravelling the mysterious Galactic centre, contributing to the observations of the first solar-like oscillations in another star, and breaking many distance records by finding new galaxies in the far-away Universe. Most recently, the NTT helped detect a disc around a massive young star, solving the mystery of star formation in massive stars, and its observations were crucial to determine how asteroids are modified by solar wind.

NTT observations of stars orbiting the centre of our Milky Way helped determine the mass and the radius of its supermassive black hole, effectively helping to confirm the existence of such a massive and compact object.

== See also ==
- List of largest optical reflecting telescopes
