= Figuring =

Final polishing of an optical surface

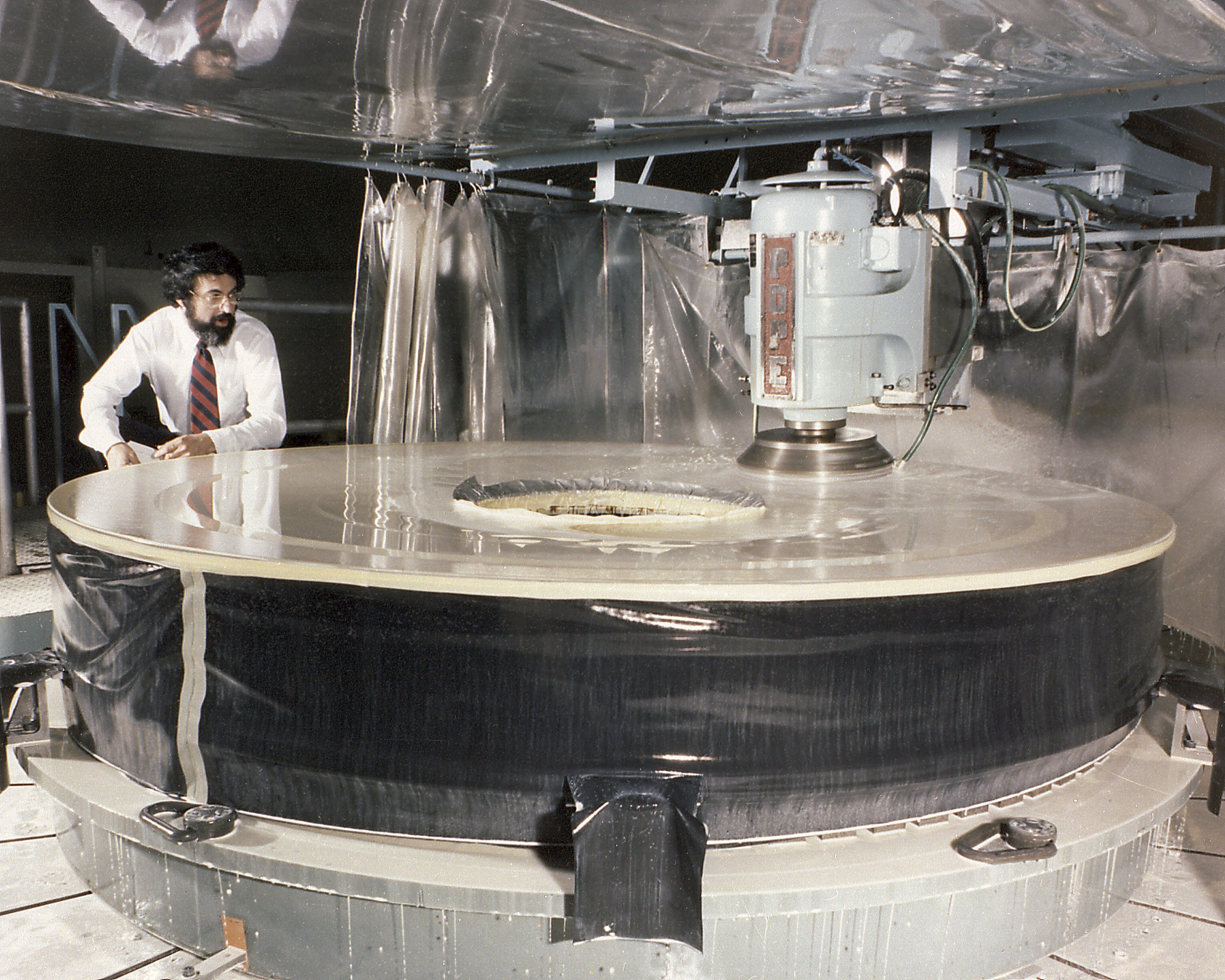
Polishing and figuring of the Hubble Space Telescope's primary mirror

Figuring is the process of final polishing of an optical surface to remove imperfections or modify the surface curvature to achieve the shape required for a given application.

== Types ==
An example of figuring is that used in reflecting telescope primary mirrors in a process of converting the smooth spherical mirror produced by earlier stages into the aspherical or parabolic shapes needed to form the correct image. It is done by applying different polishing stroke lengths with different sized and shaped tools. Manual figuring is a very laborious process, since the heat produced by polishing has to be allowed to dissipate before the shape of the mirror can be measured again, and the places for later polishing selected. Testing of the figure is usually done by a Foucault knife-edge test or Ronchi test in amateur telescope making and with very sophisticated null testers on research telescope optics.

For large mirrors, ion figuring is often used, in which a neutral atomic beam is used to remove material from the optics in a very controlled way. This is particularly useful in the manufacture of segmented mirrors, since the shape of the optics can be maintained correctly all the way to the edge of the aperture, whilst mechanical polishing techniques tend to have trouble with distortion of the polishing tool when it overhangs the edge. The first major use of ion figuring was in making the mirror segments for the Keck telescope.

The ultra-high precision requirements for optical surfaces for X-ray astronomy and deep-ultraviolet lithography often require ion figuring.

Issues for ion beam figuring included re-sputtering and contamination.
