= Ronchi ruling =

Optical component

A Ronchi ruling

A Ronchi ruling, Ronchi grating, or Ronchi mask, named after the Italian physicist Vasco Ronchi, is a constant-interval bar and space square-wave optical target or mask. The design produces a precisely patterned light source by reflection or illumination, or a stop pattern by transmission, with precise uniformity, spatial frequency, sharp edge definition, and high contrast ratio.

== Manufacturing ==
Ronchi rulings are typically manufactured through photolithographic deposition of metallic chromium on a substrate, which yields a precise, nearly 100% contrast pattern. For a reflective or illuminated type, dark stripes are printed on a diffusely reflecting or translucent substrate, such as a square of white ceramic material or opal glass. For a transmissive type, opaque stripes are printed on a transparent glass substrate. A transmissive type may be readily modified to act as an illuminated type by stacking a reflective object behind it.

== Applications ==
A test target in the Ronchi pattern provides a precise signal for testing resolution, contrast, distortion, aberrations, and diffraction in optical imaging systems. In constructing telescope mirrors, the Ronchi test procedure evaluates the quality of the surface figure and provides guidance on refining the figure. The ruled divisions in a linear encoder are in the form of Ronchi ruling, which provides the basic precision of the measurements.

A single Ronchi device provides a pattern that is periodic in one dimension. Stacking a pair of Ronchi transmission elements produces a two-dimensional array of periodic rectangular or rhomboidal apertures. By varying the translation, rotation, and chosen frequency of one element against the other, a wide assortment of laboratory test patterns can be generated with the paired arrangement.

Telescopic focusing aids such as the Bahtinov mask consist of multiple adjacent Ronchi transmission stop patterns. Inserting a Ronchi mask in the entrance aperture produces diffraction effects in the image, which visibly change with the focusing condition.

== See also ==
- 1951 USAF resolution test chart
