= Assy-Turgen Observatory =

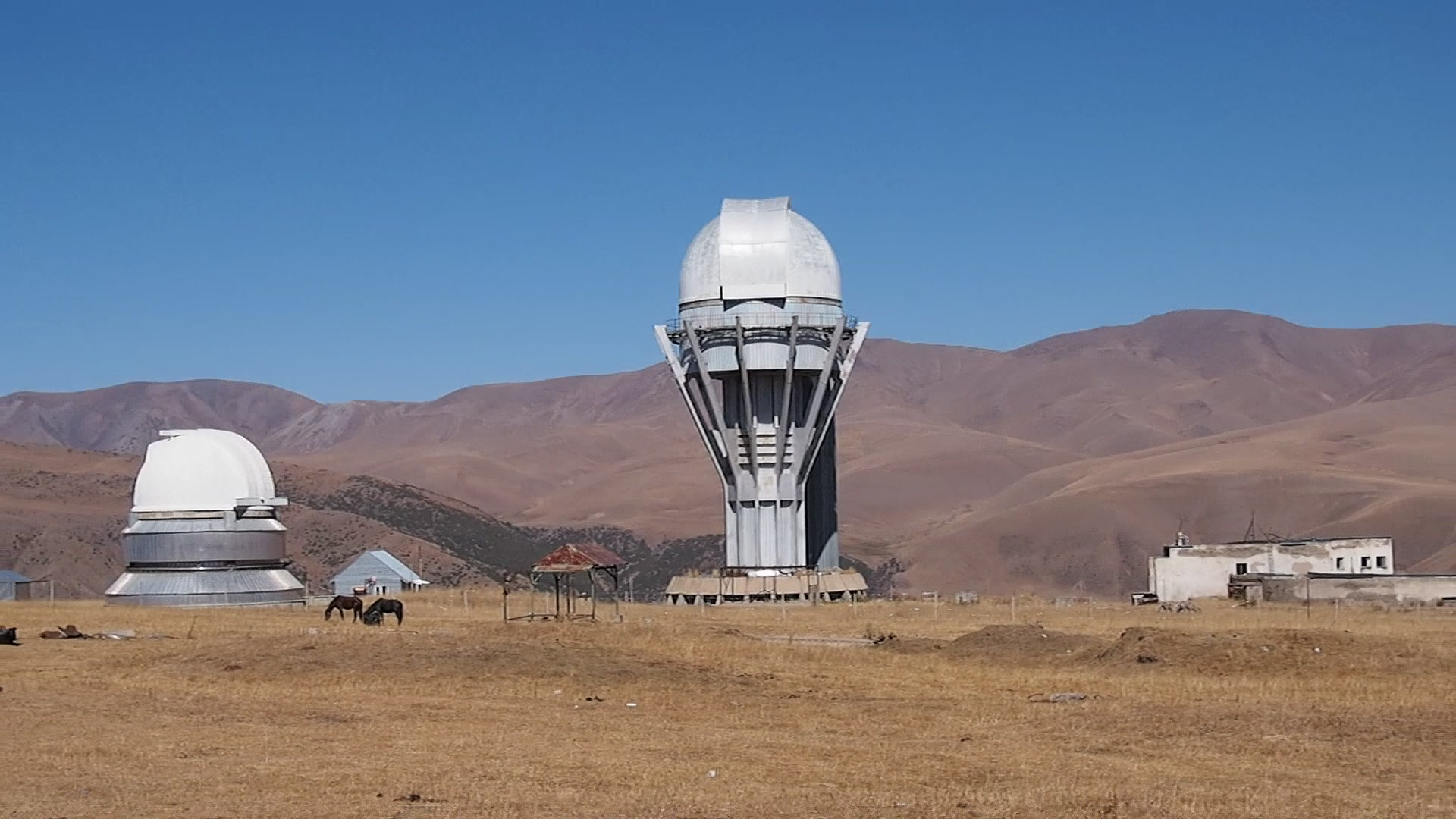
- Domes of 1-meter and 1.5-meter reflectors at Assy-Turgen
- Observatory code: 217
- Location: Assy-Turgen, Almaty Region, Kazakhstan
- Coordinates: 43°13′31″N 77°52′18″E
- Altitude: 2,750 metres (9,020 ft)

Telescopes
- 1.5-m AZT-20 telescope: 1.5 m Cassegrain reflector
- 1-m Zeiss-1000 telescope: 1 m Ritchey–Chrétien reflector
- NUTTelA-TAO: 700 mm Modified Dall-Kirkham (CDK) reflector
- Location of Assy-Turgen Observatory
- Related media on Commons

The Assy-Turgen Observatory (ATO), Full name: Academician Omarov Assy-Turgen Observatory, is an astronomical observatory located in the Assy-Turgen region not far from Almaty, Kazakhstan, within a national park. The nearest city is Esik. The observatory is operated by the Fesenkov Astrophysical Institute. Time zone is GMT+6.

== General information ==
The observatory, referred to as the Assy-Turgen Observatory, the Assy Observatory, and the Assy-Turgen Astrophysical Observatory, is located at an altitude of 2,750 metres (9,020 ft) above sea level, 85 kilometres (53 mi) east of Almaty.

The process of building began in 1975. The first observations took place in 1981 via telescope - Zeiss-1000. In the beginning of the 1980s the process of building of 1.5-m telescope dome began. The dome was 45 meters (148 ft) in height, but due to total crisis (because of Soviet Union collapse) the process of building was frozen in 1992 and only 22 years later in 2014 continued. In 2015 main (parabolic) mirror with diameter 1.5 meters (61 in) was installed on the telescope AZT-20. First light AZT-20 saw in October 2016. Since 2017 at the regular exploitation.

The Nazarbayev University Transient Telescope (CDK-700) at Assy-Turgen Astrophysical Observatory (NUTTelA-TAO) was installed during 2018 at 43°13′35″N 77°52′22″E.

According to the website of the Fesenkov Astrophysical Institute, the observatory has low turbulence—i.e., good astronomical seeing.

On the territory of the Assy-Turgen observatory, the average FWHM value is <2 ″, which is considered the best astroclimatic conditions in Kazakhstan. High transparency and low turbulence of air masses, absence of light pollution create favorable conditions for observational astrophysics.

== Instruments ==
=== Telescope Carl Zeiss-1000 ===
- Type: reflector
- Optical system: Ritchey–Chrétien
- Main mirror diameter: D = 1016 mm
- Equivalent focal length: F = 13300 mm
- English mount
- Year of exploitation beginning: 1981
- Equipment: slit spectrograph UAGS, set of BVR-filters for photometry, CCD-cameras (SBIG ST-7, SBIG ST-8)
- Current status: no observations, under reconstruction

=== Telescope AZT-20 ===
- Type: reflector
- Optical system: Cassegrain
- Main mirror diameter: D = 1560 mm
- Focal length with focus corrector: F = 5720 mm
- Maximal possible field of view: FOV = 60 х 60 arc min
- German type equatorial mount
- Year of exploitation beginning: 2017
- Equipment: CCD-camera for photometry FLI Pro LIne with g’r’i’z’ - filters. In 2021 are planned to install a spectrograph with volume-phase gratings (VPH).
- Current status: regular observations take place

=== Telescope CDK-700 ===
- Type: reflector
- Optical system: Ritchey–Chrétien
- Main mirror diameter: D = 700 mm
- Equivalent focal length: F = 4540 mm
- Maximal possible field of view: FOV = 30 х 30 arc min
- Alt-Azimuth mount
- Year of exploitation beginning: 2018

Current status: regular observations take place, the telescope belongs to Energetic Cosmos Laboratory of Nazarbaev university.

== Gallery ==
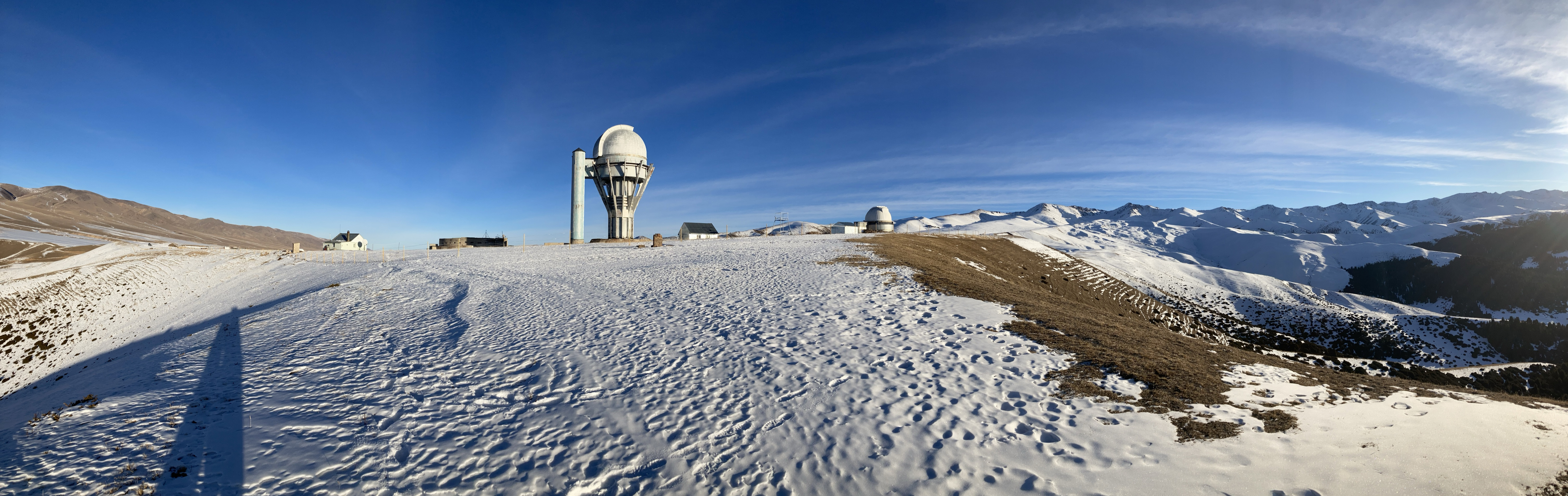
Panorama of Assy-Turgen observatory

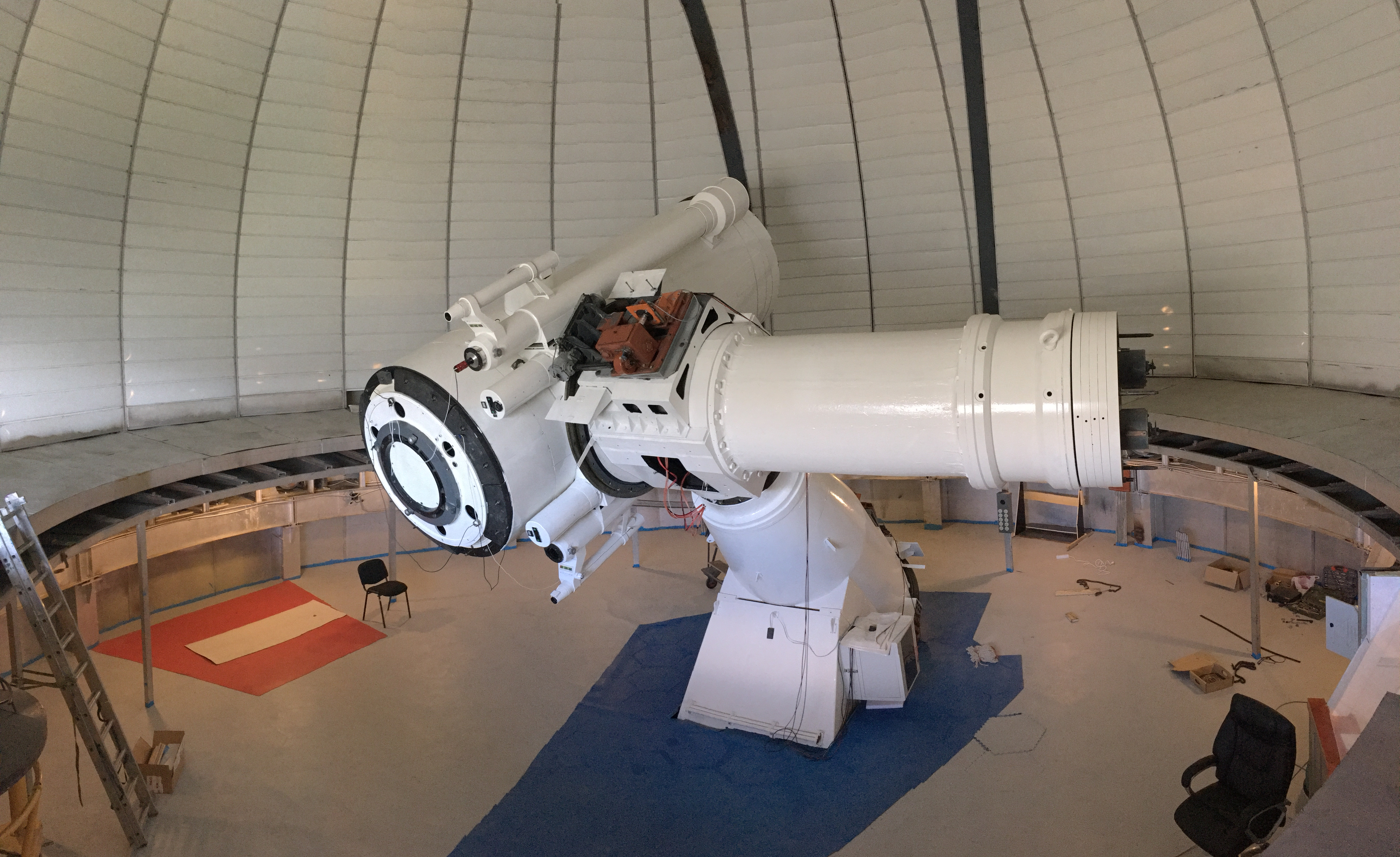
1.5-m telescope AZT-20

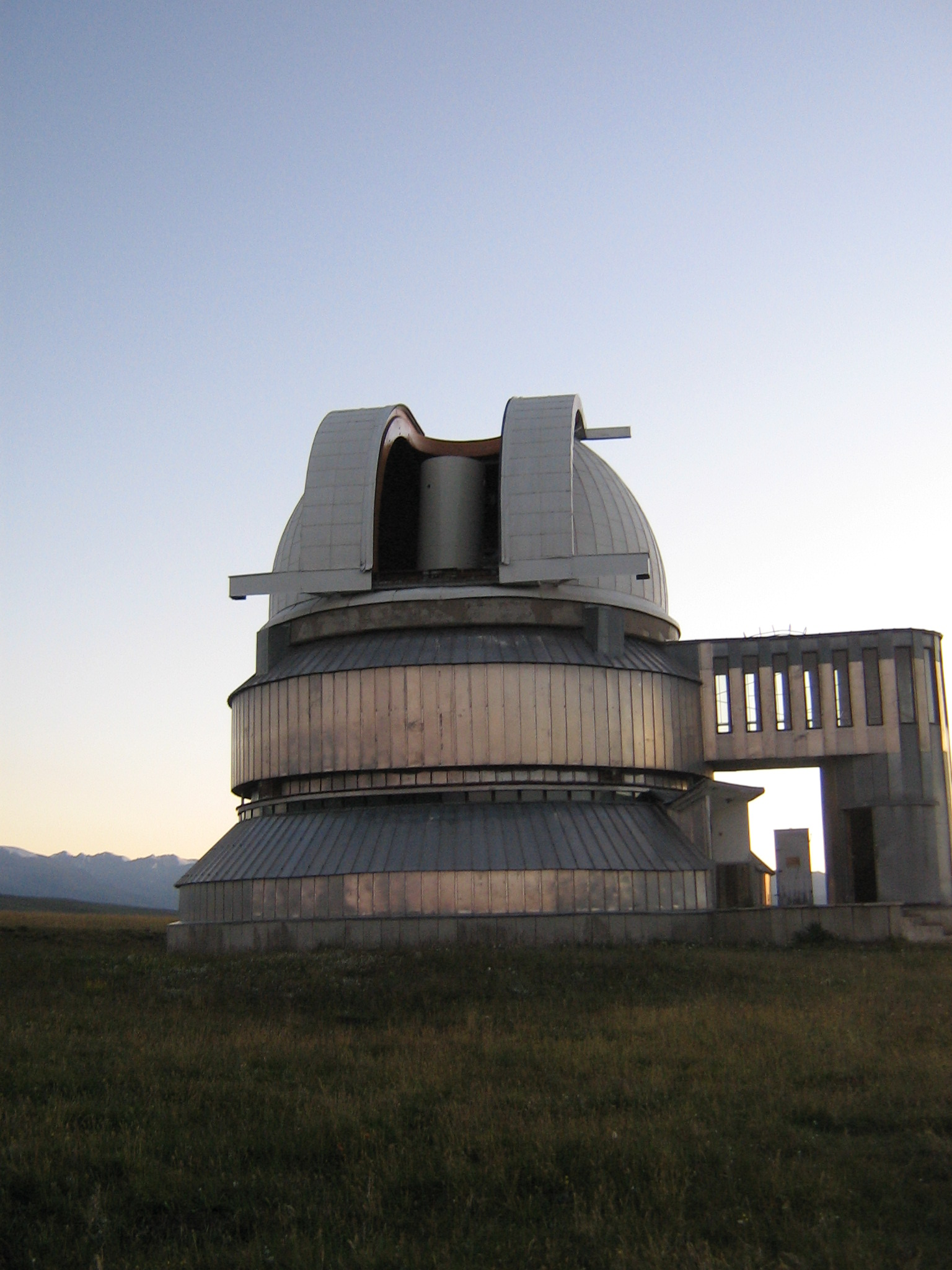
1-m telescope dome

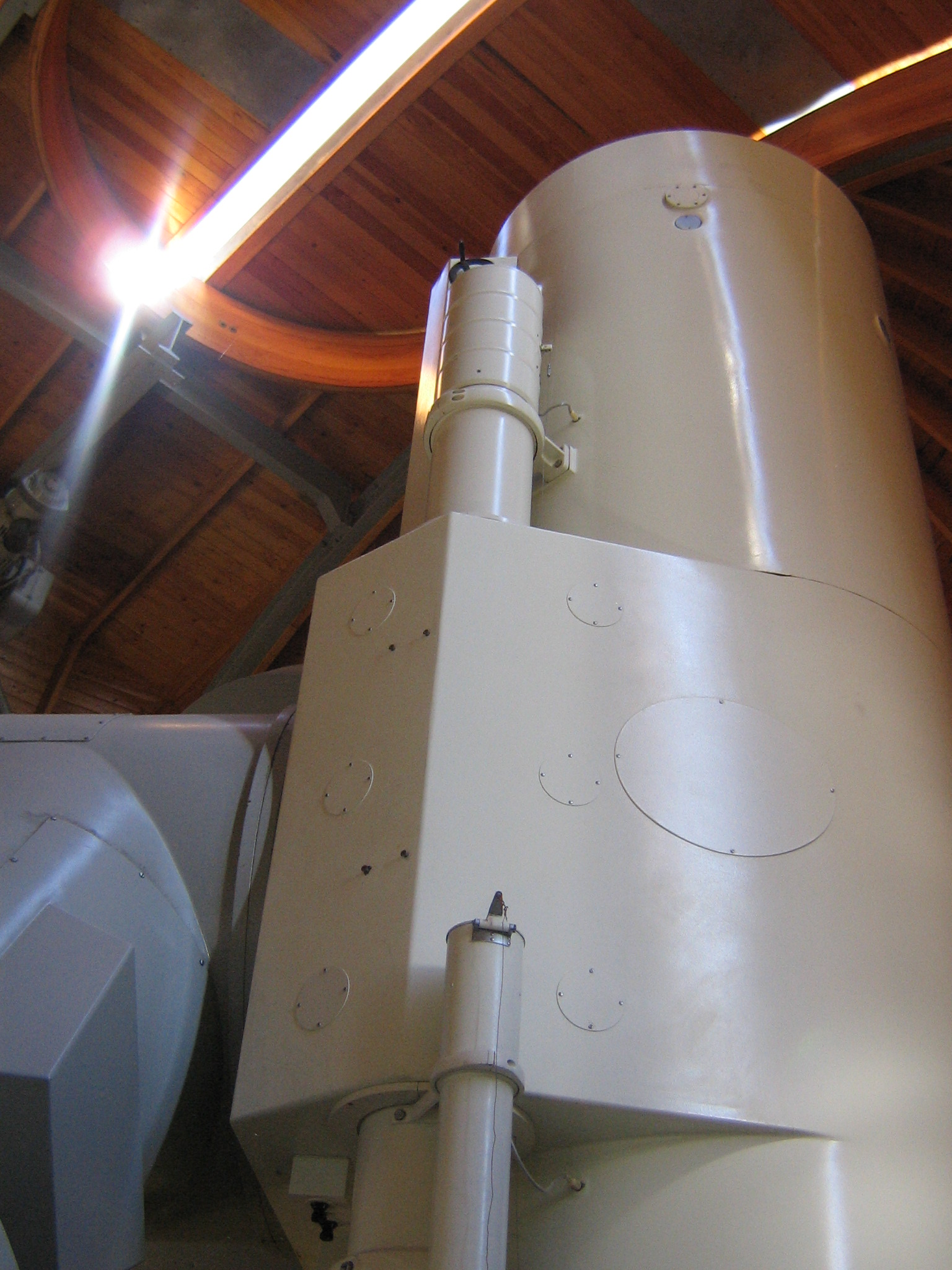
1-m Zeiss-1000 telescope
