= Null corrector =

Optical component

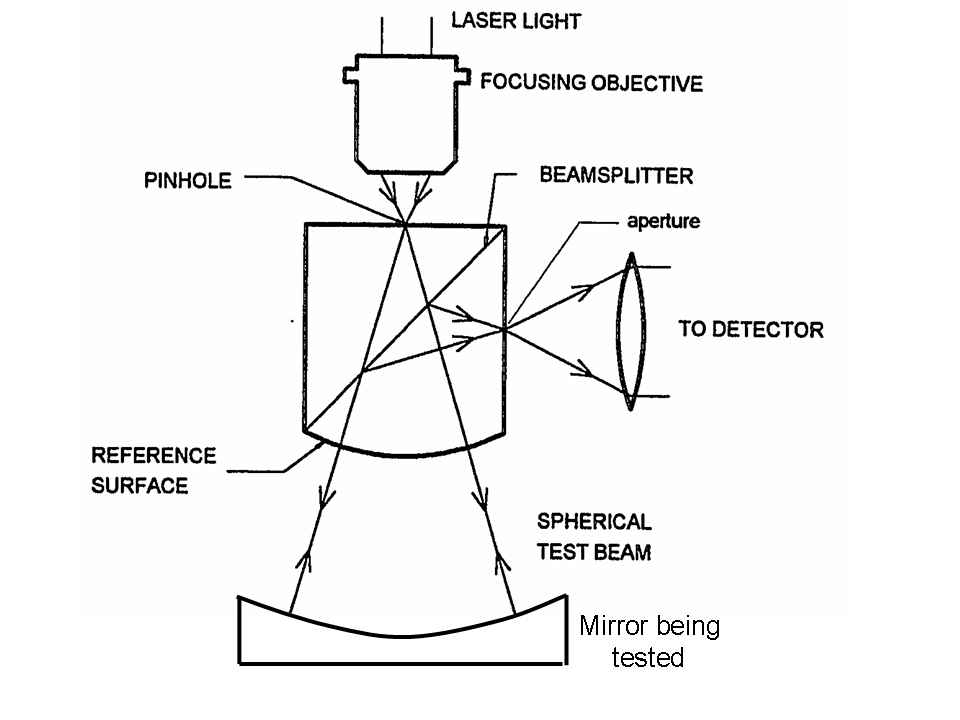
Testing a spherical mirror using an interferometer. All surfaces in the tester are either flat or spherical, so the tester itself is fairly easy to fabricate and test. This setup can test a spherical mirror of any size – since the wavefront is spherical, the mirror can be small and close up, or many meters across and further away. The test only requires that the pinhole be located at the center of sphere defined by the mirror's surface.

A null corrector is an optical device used in the testing of large aspheric mirrors. A spherical mirror of any size can be tested relatively easily using standard optical components such as laser, mirrors, beamsplitters, and converging lenses. One method of doing this using a Shack cube is shown at the right, and many other setups are possible. An interferometer test such as this one generates a contour map of the deviation of the surface from a perfect sphere, with the contours in units of half the wavelength used. This is called a null test because when the mirror is perfect, the result is null (no contours at all). If the result is not null, then the mirror is not perfect, and the pattern shows where the optician should polish the mirror to improve it.

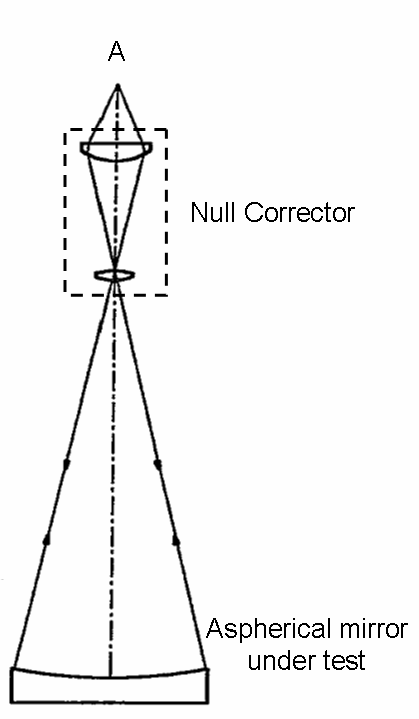
Adding a null corrector so the interferometer test can measure an aspheric mirror. The null corrector cancels the non-spherical portion of the mirror figure, so when viewed from point A, the combination looks precisely spherical if the mirror under test has the correct figure. Diagram is not to scale – the null corrector is much smaller than shown here.

However, the mirrors used in modern telescopes are not spherical – they are rotations of parabolas or hyperbolas, since these more complex shapes reduce optical aberrations and give a larger field of view. (See, for example, Ritchey-Chrétien telescope, or three-mirror anastigmats such as LSST.) Non-spherical mirrors such as these will not give a null result when tested as above, and tests that give null results are strongly preferred (they require little interpretation, and the results translate directly to polishing requirements). One solution is to introduce a null corrector. This consists of one or more lenses and/or mirrors introduced into the optical path that make the desired mirror look like a perfectly spherical mirror. Using this device, the measured contour map now shows the difference from the desired shape instead of the difference from a sphere. Now measurement and polishing can proceed just as in the spherical case. This method is used in the manufacture of almost all large mirrors for modern telescopes.

Since the mirror will be ground to what the null corrector reports as the right prescription, it is critical that the null corrector be itself correct. An error in building the null corrector led to the mirror in the Hubble Space Telescope being ground to the wrong shape. Less famously, this has happened in other cases as well, such as the New Technology Telescope. Originally, there was no easy way to test a null corrector, so mirror fabricators needed to take extra care that the lenses were correct and spaced correctly (this second part, spacing, was the source of the Hubble null corrector failure). With the advent of computer-generated holograms, it is now possible to create a hologram with the phase response of an arbitrary mirror. Such a hologram can be made to analytically duplicate the phase response of the desired mirror, then be tested with the null corrector just as the real mirror would be tested. If the combination looks like a spherical mirror to the interferometer, then both the null corrector and the hologram are correct with high probability, since the null corrector and the hologram are constructed independently by different procedures. This procedure was used to test (and find an error in) the null corrector used for the MMT Observatory single-mirror retrofit.
