= Lurie–Houghton telescope =

Type of telescope

A Lurie–Houghton telescope

The Houghton telescope or Lurie–Houghton telescope is a catadioptric telescope. Houghton's original design uses a two-lens corrector at the front of the telescope and a spherical mirror at the back; it was patented in 1944. Instead of the hard to make intricately shaped compound curve Schmidt corrector plate, or the heavy Maksutov-type meniscus corrector lens, the Houghton double-lens corrector is relatively easy to make.

The corrector consists of two lenses: A positive and a negative, (Note: By definition, a "corrector lens" has total power 1, or a magnification ratio of 1:1 : It does not enlarge or focus the image, but only adds in equal and opposite aberrations to the aberrations produced by the rest of the optical system it is designed to improve. The contrary aberrations cancel or greatly reduce distortions in the final image, such as coma, spherical aberration, barrel distortion, and formerly chromatic aberration.: A particular example of a type of corrector lens used in camera telescopes (e.g. a Schmidt camera or a Maksutov camera) is called a "field flattener", which causes the image to come into focus on the entire surface of the film plane (or the digital counterpart), rather than needing to bend or distort the film to compensate for curvature in the focal plane.; Another example is an older type of corrector lens called a color corrector, historically used to improve observatorys' older refracting telescopes, to remove their color distortion, each one custom-made for the objective lens of a particular telescope. Modern refracting telescopes (typically used for amateur long-exposure astrophotography) currently incorporate color correction into the compound main lens, using an apochromatic, superachromat, or hyperachromat design equivalent to or superior to an old-fashioned color corrector, normally with fewer optical components; hence the current rarity of separate lenses for color-correction.) set at the front of the telescope, whose diameter determines the telescope's optical aperture. All lens and mirror surfaces are spherical, which eases construction. These lenses are relatively thin, though not as thin as the Schmidt corrector. Light loss and "ghost" reflections, troublesome in the past, are minimal with modern anti-reflective coatings.

Lurie's modification of Houghton's original design places a diagonal mirror on the corrector, to direct the focused light outside the telescope tube in the same way as a Newtonian telescope; doing so allows a shorter focal length and wider field of view.

== The corrector ==
Each surface of the lenses in the corrector creates a degree of freedom to correct optical aberrations. There are enough degrees of freedom to correct for spherical aberration, coma, and field curvature. It is placed in the path of the incoming light rays, which are parallel, so the residual chromatic aberration is very nearly zero. The Houghton corrector can be made of the same type of glass (usually BK7) which reduces cost. The design tolerances are very relaxed, compared to the similar Maksutov telescopes.

There are two types of correctors: symmetric and asymmetric. In the symmetric version r_{1} = −r_{3} and r_{2} = −r_{4} which allows for interferometry testing of the surfaces against each other. However, the correction is not quite as good as with the asymmetric corrector, which has four different radii.

The following figure shows the equations necessary to design the symmetric-form of the corrector. (Note: Note that in these equations D is not the diameter of the primary mirror; rather, it is the distance from the mirror to the corrector as a fraction of the focal length of the mirror.)

Houghton doublet corrector design equations – special case symmetric design.

== The mirrors ==
Unlike the paraboloidal mirror used in the Newtonian telescope, the Houghton uses a spheroidal primary mirror. A spheroidal mirror is much easier to make because the entire surface appears to uniformly "black out" when checked with a Foucault test. In the Houghton and the Lurie–Houghton, the radius of curvature of the primary mirror is slightly less than that of the total system. The diameter of the primary mirror should be larger than the aperture set by the corrector, to reduce vignetting.

The secondary mirror in the Lurie–Houghton is identical to the secondary mirror in a Newtonian telescope. An advantage of the Lurie–Houghton over the Newtonian is that the secondary mirror can be mounted to one of the corrector lenses, thus eliminating the spider mount. This eliminates star image diffraction spikes, caused by the vanes of the spider mount.

== See also ==
- List of telescope types
- Newtonian telescope
