= Sheep Hill Observatory =

Observatory in New Jersey, US

- Interactive map of Sheep Hill Observatory
- Type: Astronomical observatory
- Location: Boonton in New Jersey, United States
- Coordinates: 40°55′08″N 74°24′22″W
- Created: 1973
- Operator: Sheep Hill Astronomical Association
- Open: 3rd Friday of Each Month
- Website: www.sheephillastro.org

Sheep Hill Observatory is an Astronomical observatory located in Morris County, New Jersey. It features an 18-inch BBC Newtonian reflecting telescope and is open to the public on the 3rd Friday evening of each month, weather permitting. It is also made available to Schools, Scouting Groups and other educational groups upon request.

== History ==
The Sheep Hill Astronomical Association began in the mid 1960s as the Booth Astronomical Association, named after Les Booth, a former Boonton High School principal who taught night classes on astronomy. After he retired, his former students got together with him and formed the organization with the goal of building an observatory.

Sheep Hill, in Boonton New Jersey was the chosen location. The group secured donations of materials, labor and money including the skills of 2 master masons from Boonton, Edmund De Dominicus and Leonard Creatura, who constructed the building. The 16 foot diameter steel dome was set on the building by crane and the observatory was completed in 1973. The original instrument was a 16-inch Newtonian reflector and custom equatorial mount, all built by the club members.

In August 2001 the main telescope was replaced with an 18" reflector.

== Sheep Hill Astronomical Association ==
The observatory is owned and operated by the Sheep Hill Astronomical Association, a volunteer group of astronomy enthusiasts. Membership in the group is open to anyone with an interest in astronomy. SHAA is a registered 501(c)(3) not for profit educational organization. Funding for the observatory is derived mainly from membership dues.

== Main telescope ==
The current telescope housed in the observatory is a custom built, Newtonian reflecting telescope. The primary mirror is a Galaxy Optics f/4.45 parabolic mirror. The telescope is mounted on a custom made equatorial fork mount. The mount is equipped with a sidereal rate tracking motor and gear system.

Telescope Specifications
Diameter	457mm (18 inches)
Focal Ratio	f/4.45
Focal Length	2033mm
Resolution	0.253 arc/sec
Maximum Magnification	900x

== Past Instruments ==
The Kimball-Kennedy Telescope (1973-1978) The historic Kimball Kennedy telescope was loaned to the observatory when it was completed in 1973. Built by the Montclair Telescope Club and winning awards at Stellafane in 1967, the 16" scope is a Newtonian Cassegrain design which can be configured to operate as a standard Newtonian, or by substituting the secondary mirror and moving the focuser could operate as a Cassegrain telescope. It was mounted on a split-ring design mount. The Kimball has made its rounds of the area, going to the Morris Museum Astronomical Society after leaving Sheep Hill and now resides with the Skyland Stargazers club in their observatory at UACNJ in Hope, NJ.

16 Inch Newtonian (1978-2001) The club's first telescope was completed in 1978 and was a 16-inch Newtonian telescope. The mount, still in use today was a custom equatorial fork made of steel pipe and a train axle. The entire telescope and mount were designed and built by the club's original members.

== See also ==
- List of astronomical observatories
