= Meniscus corrector =

Negative meniscus lens

Albert Bouwers 1941 catadioptric telescope with a concentric meniscus corrector

A meniscus corrector is a negative meniscus lens that is used to correct spherical aberration in image-forming optical systems such as catadioptric telescopes. It works by having the equal but opposite spherical aberration of the objective it is designed to correct (usually a spherical mirror).

== Types ==
Meniscus correctors are used as full aperture correctors, most commonly in a Maksutov telescope sub type called the Gregory or "spot" Maksutov–Cassegrain telescope. They are also used in the Bouwers meniscus telescope. There are Maksutov variations that use the same principle but place the meniscus lens as a sub-aperture corrector near the focus of the objective. There are other sub-aperture meniscus corrector catadioptric telescopes such as the Argunov–Cassegrain telescope and the Klevtsov–Cassegrain telescope.

== Invention ==
The idea of using the spherical aberration of a meniscus lens to correct the opposite aberration in a spherical objective dates back as far as W. F. Hamilton's 1814 Hamiltonian telescope, in Colonel A. Mangin's 1876 Mangin mirror, and also appears in Ludwig Schupmann's Schupmann medial telescope near the end of the 19th century.

After the invention of the wide-field Schmidt camera in the early 1930s, at least four optical designers in early 1940s war-torn Europe came up with the idea of replacing the complicated Schmidt corrector plate with a simpler meniscus lens, including Albert Bouwers, Dmitri Dmitrievich Maksutov, K. Penning, and Dennis Gabor. All of these designs used full aperture correctors (a meniscus corrector shell) to create a wide-field telescope with little or no coma or astigmatism. Albert Bouwers built a prototype meniscus telescope in August 1940 and patented it in February 1941. His design had the mirror and meniscus lens with surfaces that had a common centre of curvature, called a "concentric" or "monocentric" telescope. The design had an ultrawide field of view but did not correct chromatic aberration and was only suitable as a monochromatic astronomical camera. Dmitri Maksutov built a prototype for a similar type of meniscus telescope, the Maksutov telescope, in October 1941, and patented it in November of that same year. His design corrected most spherical aberration and also corrected for chromatic aberration by placing a weakly negative-shaped meniscus corrector closer to the primary mirror. Dennis Gabor's 1941 design was a non-monocentric meniscus corrector. Wartime secrecy kept these designers from knowing about each other's design, making each invention independent.

== See also ==
- Catadioptric system
