= Catadioptric system =

Optical system where refraction and reflection are combined

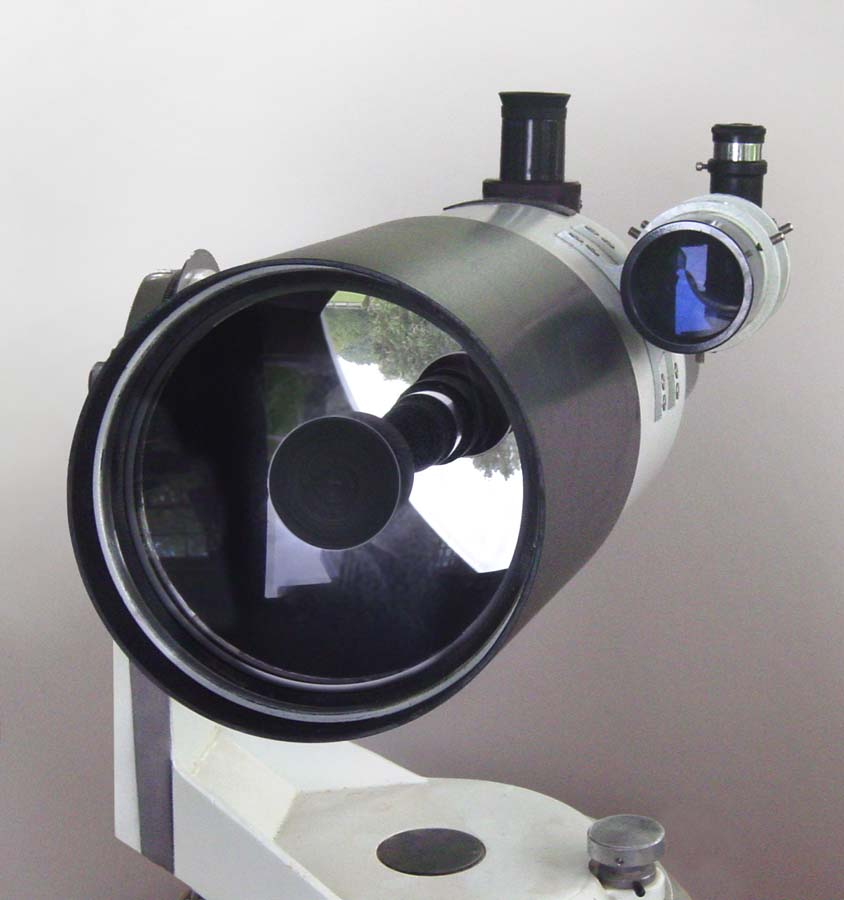
A 150 mm aperture catadioptric Maksutov telescope

A catadioptric optical system is one where refraction and reflection are combined in an optical system, usually via lenses (dioptrics) and curved mirrors (catoptrics). Catadioptric combinations are used in focusing systems such as searchlights, headlamps, early lighthouse focusing systems, optical telescopes, microscopes, and telephoto lenses. Other optical systems that use lenses and mirrors are also referred to as "catadioptric", such as surveillance catadioptric sensors.

== Early catadioptric systems ==
Catadioptric combinations have been used for many early optical systems. In the 1820s, Augustin-Jean Fresnel developed several catadioptric lighthouse reflector versions of his Fresnel lens. Léon Foucault developed a catadioptric microscope in 1859 to counteract aberrations of using a lens to image objects at high power. In 1876 a French engineer, A. Mangin, invented what has come to be called the Mangin mirror, a concave glass reflector with the silver surface on the rear side of the glass. The two surfaces of the reflector have different radii to correct the aberration of the spherical mirror. Light passes through the glass twice, making the overall system act like a triplet lens. Mangin mirrors were used in searchlights, where they produced a nearly true parallel beam. Many Catadioptric telescopes use negative lenses with a reflective coating on the backside that are referred to as “Mangin mirrors”, although they are not single-element objectives like the original Mangin, and some even predate Mangin's invention.

== Catadioptric telescopes ==
Catadioptric telescopes are optical telescopes that combine specifically shaped mirrors and lenses to form an image. This is usually done so that the telescope can have an overall greater degree of error correction than their all-lens or all-mirror counterparts, with a consequently wider aberration-free field of view. Their designs can have simple all-spherical surfaces and can take advantage of a folded optical path that reduces the mass of the telescope, making them easier to manufacture. Many types employ “correctors”, a lens or curved mirror in a combined image-forming optical system so that the reflective or refractive element can correct the aberrations produced by its counterpart.

=== Catadioptric dialytes ===
Catadioptric dialytes are the earliest type of catadioptric telescope. They consist of a single-element refracting telescope objective combined with a silver-backed negative lens (similar to a Mangin mirror). The first of these was the Hamiltonian telescope patented by W. F. Hamilton in 1814. The Schupmann medial telescope designed by German optician Ludwig Schupmann near the end of the 19th century placed the catadioptric mirror beyond the focus of the refractor primary and added a third correcting/focusing lens to the system.

=== Full-aperture correctors ===
There are several telescope designs that take advantage of placing one or more full-diameter lenses (commonly called a "corrector plate") in front of a spherical primary mirror. These designs take advantage of all the surfaces being "spherically symmetrical" and were originally invented as modifications of mirror based optical systems (reflecting telescopes) to allow them to have an image plane relatively free of coma or astigmatism so they could be used as astrographic cameras. They work by combining a spherical mirror's ability to reflect light back to the same point with a large lens at the front of the system (a corrector) that slightly bends the incoming light, allowing the spherical mirror to image objects at infinity. Some of these designs have been adapted to create compact, long-focal-length catadioptric cassegrains.

==== Schmidt corrector plate ====
The Schmidt corrector, the first full-diameter corrector plate, was used in Bernhard Schmidt's 1931 Schmidt camera. The Schmidt camera is a wide-field photographic telescope, with the corrector plate at the center of curvature of the primary mirror, producing an image at a focus inside the tube assembly at the prime focus where a curved film plate or detector is mounted. The relatively thin and lightweight corrector allows Schmidt cameras to be constructed in diameters up to 1.3 m. The corrector's complex shape takes several processes to make, starting with a flat piece of optical glass, placing a vacuum on one side of it to curve the whole piece, then grinding and polishing the other side flat to achieve the exact shape required to correct the spherical aberration caused by the primary mirror. The design has lent itself to many Schmidt variants.

Popular sub-types

Light path in a Schmidt–Cassegrain

- Schmidt–Cassegrain telescopes are one of the most popular commercial designs on the amateur astronomical market, having been mass-produced since the 1960s. The design replaces the Schmidt Camera film holder with a Cassegrain secondary mirror, making a folded optical path with a long focal length and a narrow field of view.

==== Meniscus corrector shell ====
The idea of replacing the complicated Schmidt corrector plate with an easy-to-manufacture full-aperture spherical meniscus lens (a meniscus corrector shell) to create a wide-field telescope occurred to at least four optical designers in early 1940s war-torn Europe, including Albert Bouwers (1940), Dmitri Dmitrievich Maksutov (1941), K. Penning, and Dennis Gabor (1941). Wartime secrecy kept these inventors from knowing about each other's designs, leading to each being an independent invention. Albert Bouwers built a prototype meniscus telescope in August 1940 and patented it in February 1941. It used a spherically concentric meniscus and was only suitable as a monochromatic astronomical camera. In a later design he added a cemented doublet to correct chromatic aberration. Dmitri Maksutov built a prototype for a similar type of meniscus telescope, the Maksutov telescope, in October 1941 and patented it in November of that same year. His design corrected spherical and chromatic aberrations by placing a weak negative-shaped meniscus corrector closer to the primary mirror.

Popular sub-types

Light path in a meniscus telescope (Maksutov–Cassegrain)

- Maksutov–Cassegrain telescopes are the most commonly seen design that uses a meniscus corrector, a variant of the Maksutov telescope. It has a silvered "spot" secondary on the corrector, making a long focal length but compact (folded optical path) telescope with a narrow field of view. This design idea appeared in Dmitri Maksutov's 1941 notes and was originally developed in commercial designs by Lawrence Braymer (Questar, 1954), and John Gregory (1955 patent). The combination of the corrector with the silvered secondary spot makes Maksutov–Cassegrains low-maintenance and ruggedized since they can be air-sealed and fixed in alignment (collimation).

==== Houghton corrector lens ====
Houghton doublet corrector design equations – special case symmetric design.

The Houghton telescope or Lurie–Houghton telescope is a design that uses a wide compound positive-negative lens over the entire front aperture to correct spherical aberration of the main mirror. If desired, the two corrector elements can be made with the same type of glass, since the Houghton corrector's chromatic aberration is minimal.

The corrector is thicker than a Schmidt-Cassegrain's front corrector, but much thinner than a Maksutov meniscus corrector. All the lens surfaces and the mirror's surface are spheroidal, greatly easing amateur construction.

=== Sub-aperture correctors ===
Light path in an Argunov Cassegrain telescope

In sub-aperture corrector designs, the corrector elements are usually at the focus of a much larger objective. These elements can be both lenses and mirrors, but since multiple surfaces are involved, achieving good aberration correction in these systems can be very complex. Examples of sub-aperture corrector catadioptric telescopes include the Argunov–Cassegrain telescope, the Klevtsov–Cassegrain telescope and sub-aperture corrector Maksutovs, which use as a "secondary mirror" an optical group consisting of lens elements and sometimes mirrors designed to correct aberration, as well as Jones-Bird Newtonian telescopes, which use a spherical primary mirror combined with a small corrector lens mounted near the focus.

== Photographic catadioptric lenses ==
Example of a catadioptric lens using rear surfaced "mangin mirrors" (Minolta RF Rokkor-X 250mm f/5.6)

Various types of catadioptric systems are also used in camera lenses known alternatively as catadioptric lenses (CATs), reflex lenses, or mirror lenses. These lenses use some form of the cassegrain design which greatly reduces the physical length of the optical assembly, partly by folding the optical path, but mostly through the telephoto effect of the convex secondary mirror which multiplies the focal length many times (up to 4 to 5 times). This creates lenses with focal lengths from 250 mm up to and beyond 1000 mm that are much shorter and compact than their long-focus or telephoto counterparts. Moreover, chromatic aberration, a major problem with long refractive lenses, and off-axis aberration, a major problem with reflective telescopes, is almost eliminated by the catadioptric system, making the image they produce suitable to fill the large focal plane of a camera.

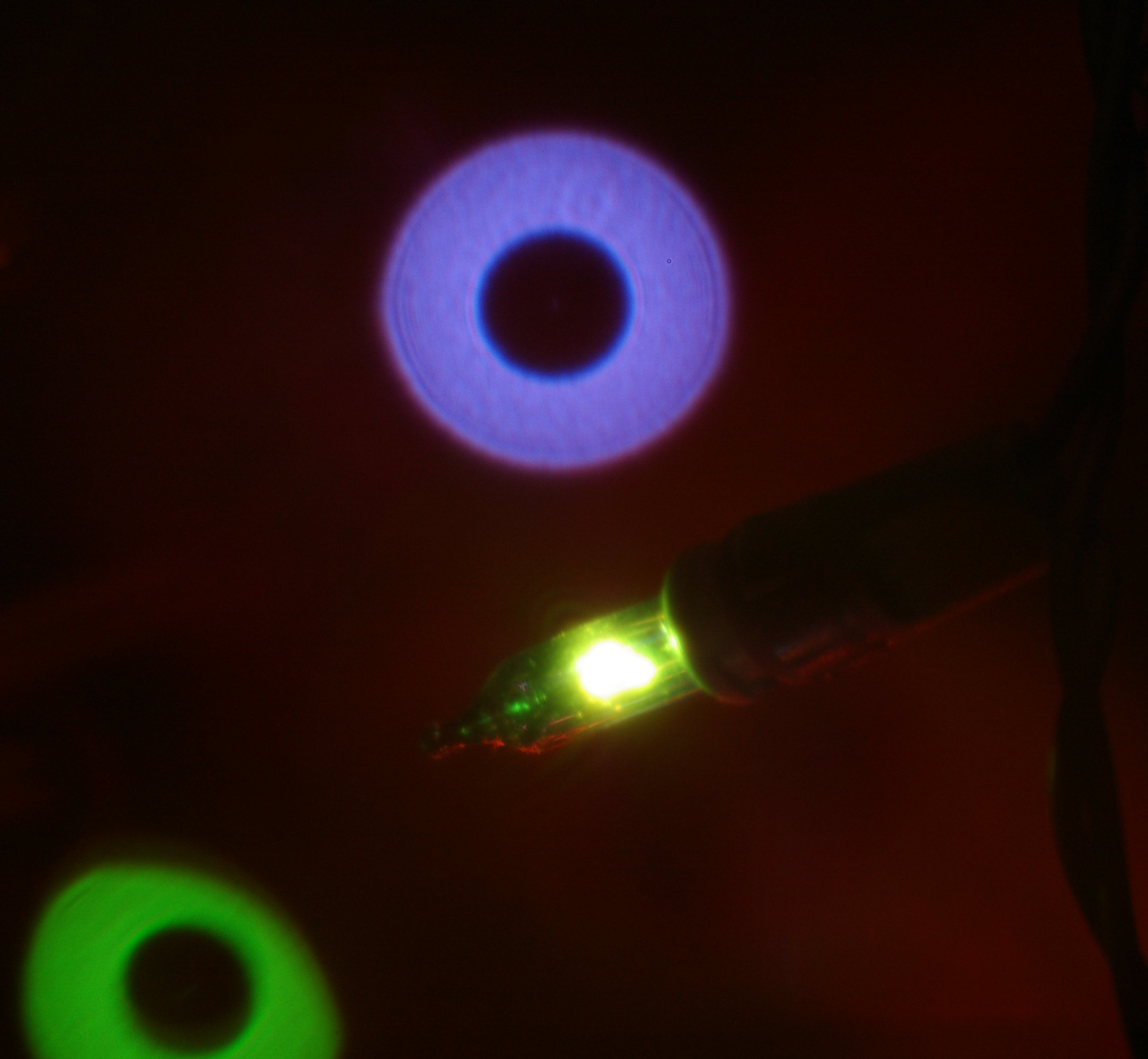
An example of 'iris blur' or bokeh produced by a catadioptric lens, behind an in-focus light

Catadioptric lenses do, however, have several drawbacks. The fact that they have a central obstruction means they cannot use an adjustable diaphragm to control light transmission. This means the lens's F-number value is fixed to the overall designed focal ratio of the optical system (the diameter of the primary mirror divided into the focal length). The inability to stop down the lens results in the catadioptric lens having a short depth of field. Exposure is usually adjusted by the placement of neutral density filters on the front or rear of the lens. Their modulation transfer function shows low contrast at low spatial frequencies. Finally, their most salient characteristic is the annular shape of defocused areas of the image, giving a doughnut-shaped 'iris blur' or bokeh, caused by the shape of the entrance pupil.

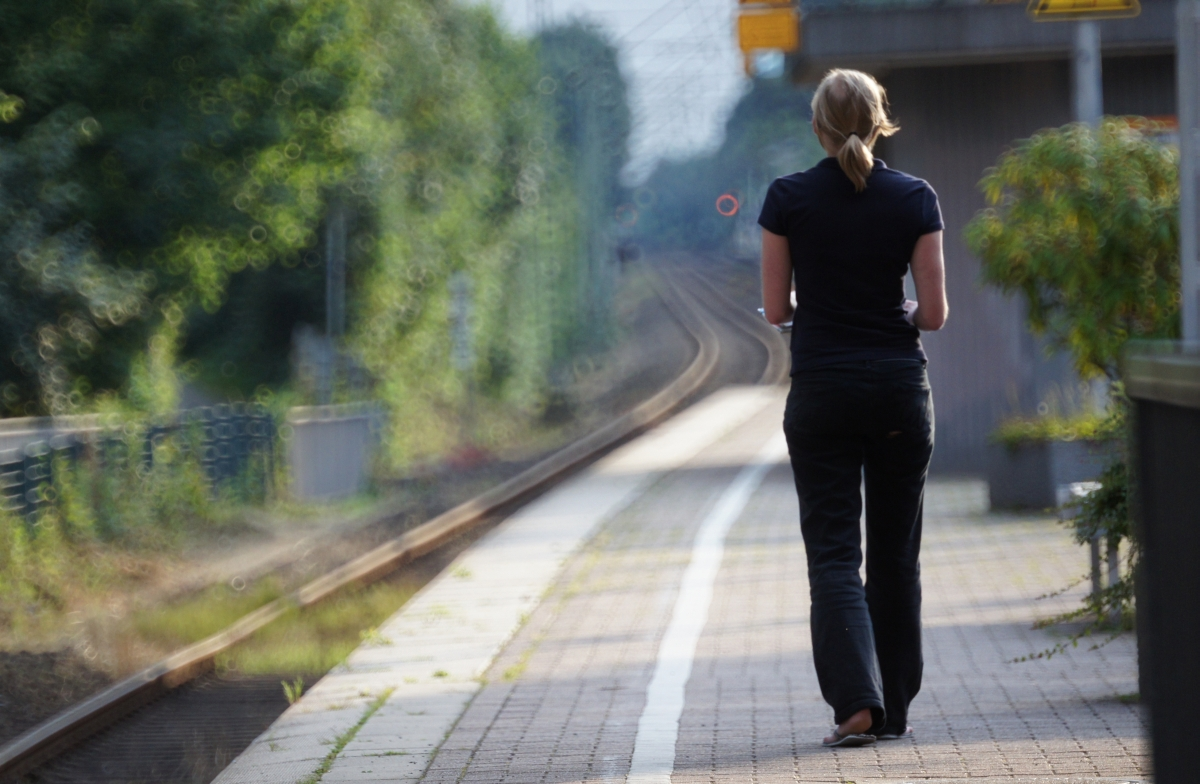
Bokeh of a mirror lens, with ring pattern in out of focus areas.

Several companies made catadioptric lenses throughout the later part of the 20th century. Nikon (under the Mirror-Nikkor and later Reflex-Nikkor names) and Canon both offered several designs, such as 500 mm 1:8 and 1000 mm 1:11. Smaller companies such as Tamron, Samyang, Vivitar, and Opteka also offered several versions, with the three latter of these brands still actively producing a number of catadioptric lenses for use in modern system cameras. Minolta (later Sony) offered a 500 mm catadioptric lens for their Alpha range of cameras. The Minolta lens had the distinction of being the only reflex lens manufactured by a major brand to feature auto-focus.

=== Gallery of catadioptric lenses ===
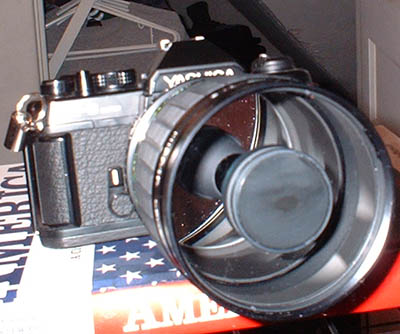
500 mm catadioptric lens mounted on a Yashica FX-3

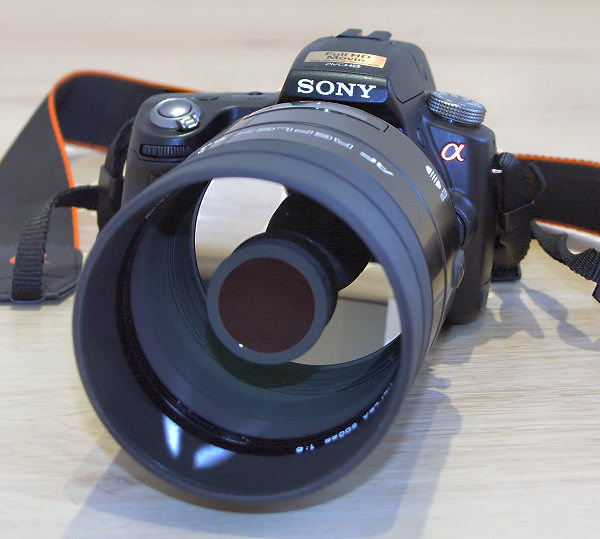
Minolta AF 500 mm F/8 catadioptric lens mounted on a Sony Alpha 55 camera

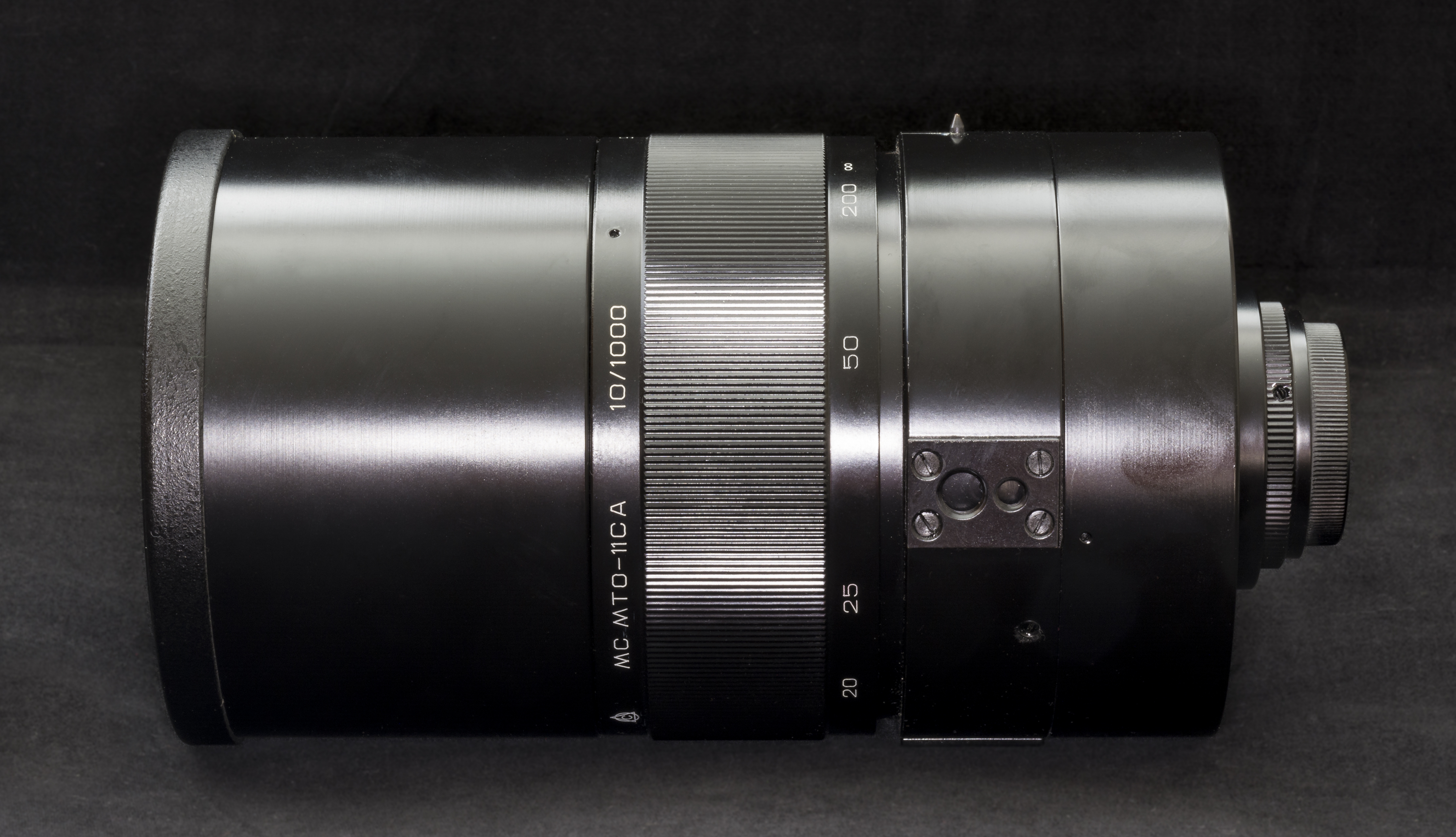
Maksutov MC MTO-11CA

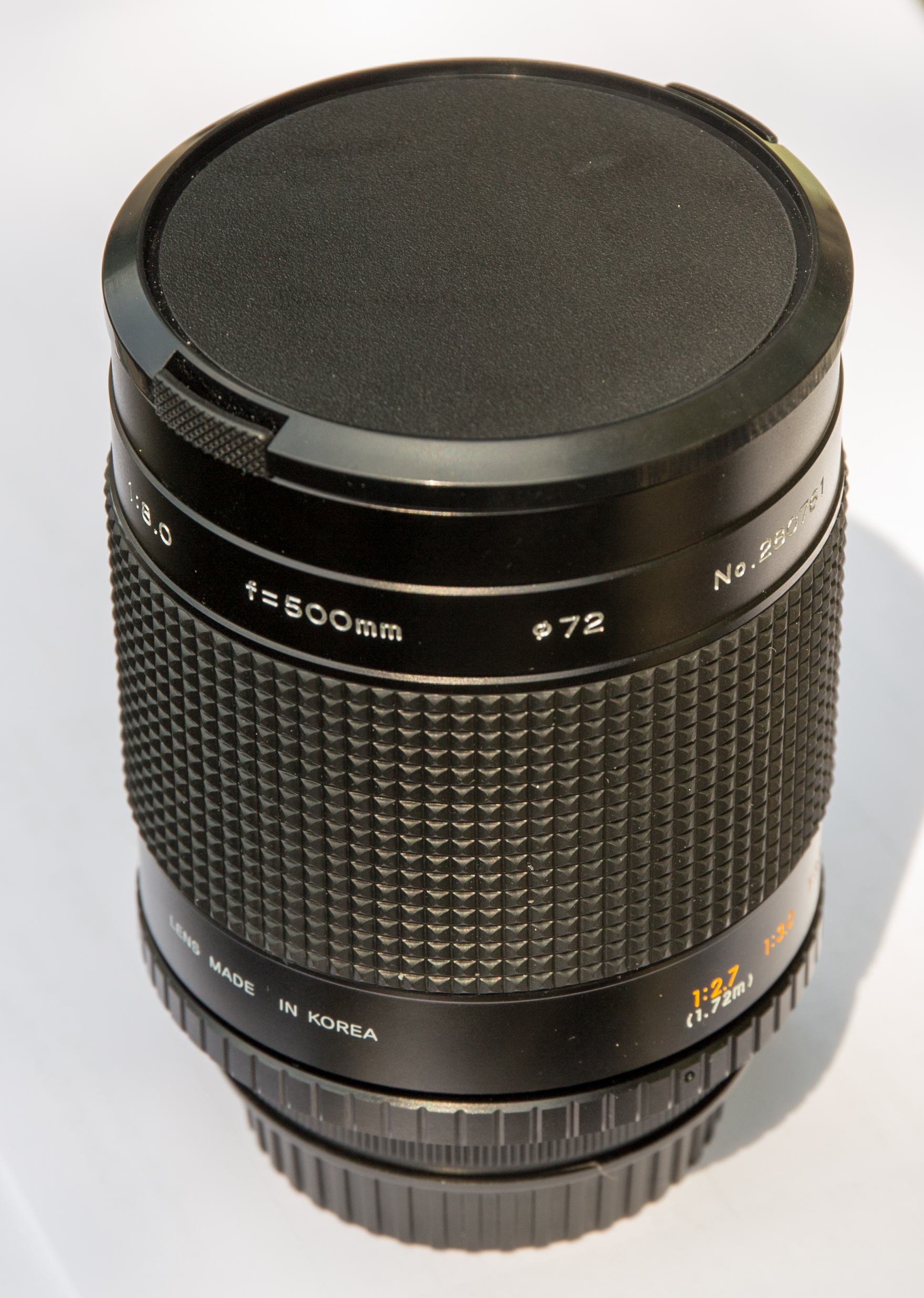
Samyang 500mm f/8

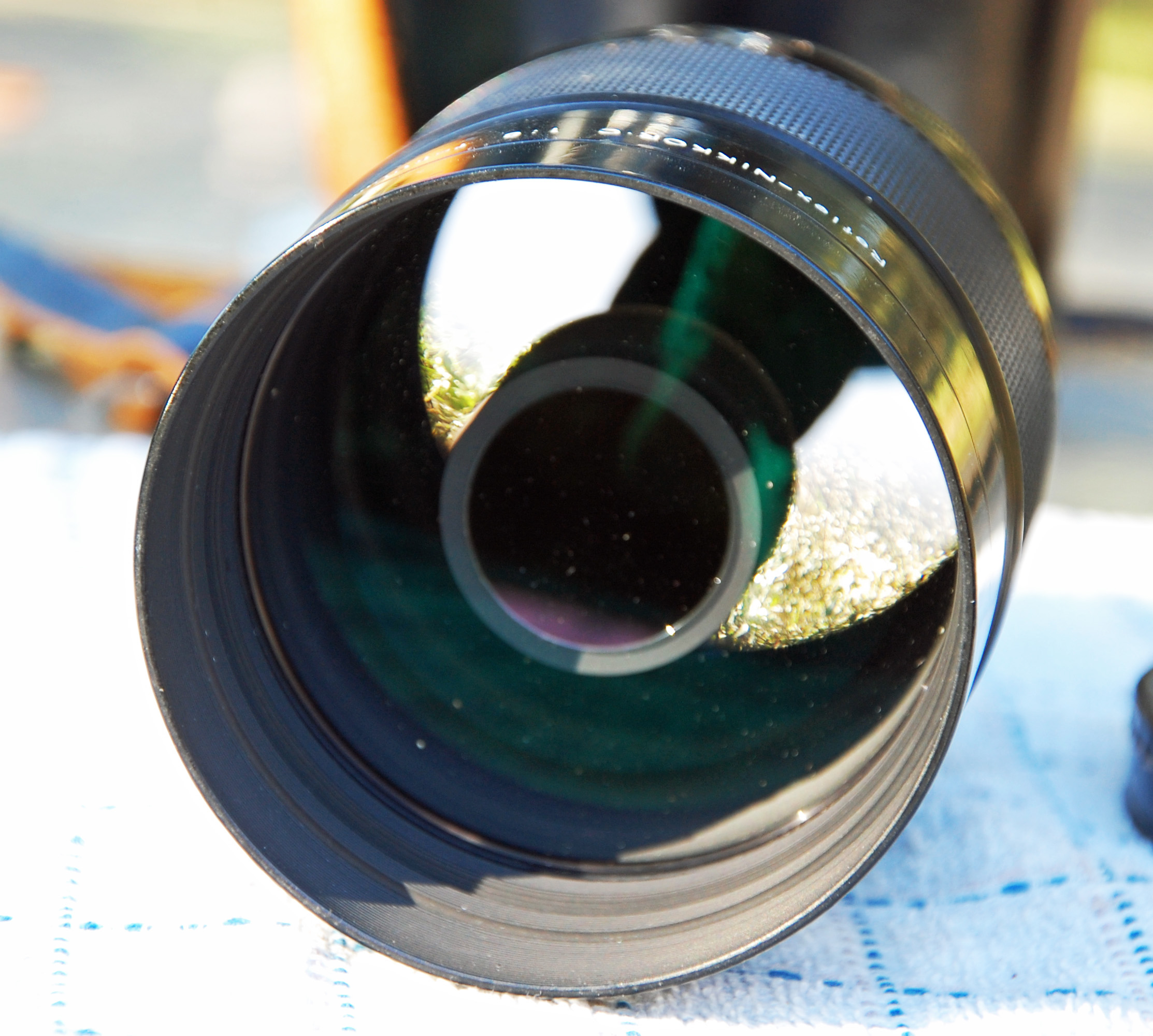
Nikon 500mm f/8 reflex lens

== See also ==
- Astrograph
- Schmidt–Cassegrain telescope
- Catoptrics
- Dioptrics
- Image-forming optical system
- List of telescope types
- Ludwig Schupmann
