= Klevtsov–Cassegrain telescope =

Type of catadioptric telescope

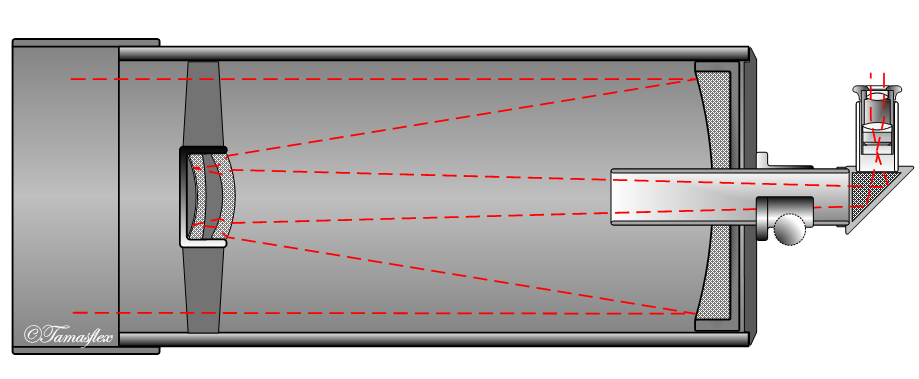
A Klevtsov-Cassegrain reflecting telescope

The Klevtsov–Cassegrain telescope is a type of catadioptric Cassegrain telescope that uses a spherical primary mirror and a sub-aperture secondary corrector group composed of a small lens and a Mangin mirror.

== Design ==
Light path in a Klevtsov-Cassegrain reflector telescope

In the Klevtsov-Cassegrain, all of the optical surfaces are spherical or near-spherical. The secondary Mangin mirror (M 2 ) and the meniscus corrector (C) are held in place by a spider vane and the front of the telescope tube is otherwise open.

These types of telescopes have the disadvantage of the spider, which holds the corrector, causing diffraction artifacts and, since multiple surfaces are involved, achieving good aberration correction can be very complex.

This design was originally envisaged by G. I. Popov with a practical implementation by Yuri A. Klevtsov. Commercial manufacturers of the design include Novosibirsk TAL and Vixen.

== See also ==
- Argunov–Cassegrain telescope
- Cassegrain reflector
- List of telescope types
