= List of telescope types =

The following are lists of devices categorized as types of telescopes or devices associated with telescopes. They are broken into major classifications with many variations due to professional, amateur, and commercial sub-types. Telescopes can be classified by optical design or mechanical design/construction. Telescopes can also be classified by where they are placed, such as space telescopes. One major determining factor is type of light, or particle being observed including devices referred to as "telescopes" that do not form an image or use optics. Some telescopes are classified by the task they perform; for example Solar telescopes are all designs that look at the Sun, Dobsonian telescopes are designed to be low cost and portable, Aerial telescopes overcame the optical shortcomings of 17th-century objective lenses, etc.

== List of optical telescope types ==
Optical telescopes can be classified by three primary optical designs (refractor, reflector, or catadioptric), by sub-designs of these types, by how they are constructed, or by the task they perform. They all have their different advantages and disadvantages and they are used in different areas of professional and amateur astronomy.

Refracting telescopes (Dioptrics)
- Achromatic telescope
  - dialytic refractor
- Apochromatic
  - Petzval telescope
- Binoculars
  - Opera glasses
- Copyscope
- Monocular
- Non-achromatic
  - Galilean telescope
  - Keplerian Telescope
    - Aerial telescope
- Superachromat
- Baden-Powell's unilens
Reflecting telescopes (Catoptrics)
- Cassegrain telescope
  - Dall–Kirkham telescope
  - Nasmyth telescope
  - Ritchey–Chrétien telescope
- Crossed Dragone
- Gregorian telescope
- Herschelian telescope
- Liquid mirror telescope
- Newtonian telescope
  - Dobsonian telescope
- Pfund telescope
- Schiefspiegler telescope
- Schwarzschild telescope
  - Couder telescope
- Stevick–Paul telescope
- Three-mirror anastigmat
- Toroidal reflector / Yolo telescope
- Wolter telescope
Catadioptric telescopes (Catadioptrics)
- Argunov–Cassegrain telescope
- Catadioptric dialytes
- Jones–Bird
- Klevtsov–Cassegrain telescope
- Lurie–Houghton telescope
- Maksutov telescope
  - Maksutov camera
  - Maksutov–Cassegrain telescope
    - Gregory (Spot) Maksutov–Cassegrain telescope
    - Rutten Maksutov–Cassegrains telescope
    - Sub-aperture corrector Maksutov-Cassegrain telescope
  - Maksutov–Newtonian telescope
- Modified Dall–Kirkham telescope
- Schmidt camera
  - Baker–Nunn camera
  - Baker–Schmidt camera
  - Lensless Schmidt telescope
  - Mersenne–Schmidt camera
  - Schmidt–Cassegrain telescope
    - ACF Schmidt–Cassegrain telescope (Meade Instruments)
  - Schmidt–Newtonian telescope
  - Schmidt–Väisälä camera
Telescopes classified by the task performed
- Astrograph
- Astronomical optical interferometry
- Comet seeker
- Finderscope
- GoTo telescopes
- Graphic telescope
- Infrared telescope
- Meridian circle
- Robotic telescope
- Solar telescope
- Space telescope
- Spotting scope
- Sun Gun Telescope
- Zenith telescope

== List of telescope types working outside the optical spectrum ==
- Atmospheric Cherenkov telescope used to detect gamma rays
- Infrared telescope
- Radio telescope
- Submillimeter telescope
- Ultraviolet telescope (see also Ultraviolet astronomy)
- X-ray telescope (see also X-ray astronomy)
  - Wolter telescope

== List of broad spectrum telescopes ==
- Fast Fourier Transform Telescope

== List of telescope mount types ==
Optical and other types of telescopes are mounted on different types of mounts.

- Fixed mount
- Transit mount
- Zenith mount
- Altazimuth mount
- Alt-alt (altitude-altitude) mount
- Equatorial mount
  - Equatorial platform
    - Poncet Platform
  - Open fork mount
  - German equatorial mount
  - English mount (polar frame mount)
  - Modified English mount
  - Barn door tracker (Scotch mount)
  - Springfield mount
- Hexapod mount
- Infinite-axis telescope (ball mount)

== See also ==
- Lists of telescopes
- List of largest infrared telescopes
- List of largest optical reflecting telescopes

Misc

- History of the telescope
