= Geseke =

- Town
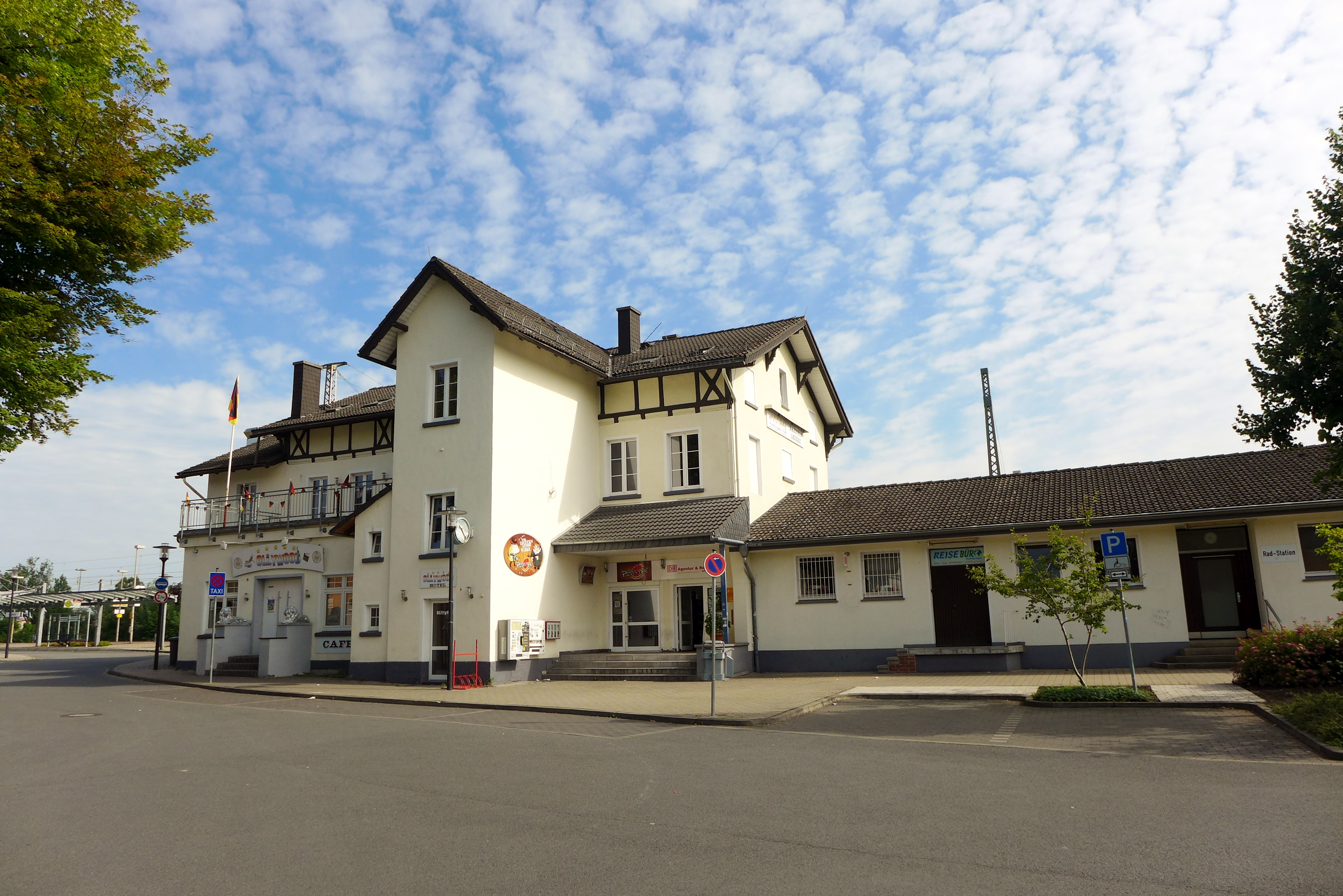
- Geseke train station

- Flag Coat of arms

- Location of Geseke within Soest district
- Interactive map of Geseke
- Location within Germany Location within North Rhine-Westphalia
- Coordinates: 51°39′N 08°31′E
- Country: Germany
- State: North Rhine-Westphalia
- Admin. region: Arnsberg
- District: Soest
- Subdivisions: 8

Government
  - Mayor (2020–25): Remco van der Velden (CDU)

Area
  - Total: 97.89 km^{2} (37.80 sq mi)
- Elevation: 104 m (341 ft)

Population (2025-12-31)
  - Total: 21,013
  - Density: 214.7/km^{2} (556.0/sq mi)
- Time zone: UTC+01:00 (CET)
  - Summer (DST): UTC+02:00 (CEST)
- Postal codes: 59590
- Dialling codes: 02942, 02954 (Eringerfeld), 02941 (Ermsinghausen)
- Vehicle registration: SO
- Website: www.geseke.de

Geseke (German pronunciation: [ˈɡeːzəkə]) is a town in the administrative district of Soest, in North Rhine-Westphalia, Germany.

== Geography ==
Geseke is situated approximately 12 km south-east of Lippstadt and 20 km south-west of Paderborn. The city is located at the Hellweg and B1. Further south in Steinhausen is the motorway that leads to the A44 (Dortmund-Kassel). In Ahden in Paderborn administrative district is the Paderborn / Lippstadt Airport. The town has its own railway station which lies next to the Edeka and the Aldi market. From Geseke, there is a connection to other cities including Paderborn and Lippstadt. The Ems-Börde-Bahn from the Eurobahn which is part of the Keolis Gruppe runs from Münster via Hamm, Soest, Lippstadt, Geseke to Paderborn and occasionally via Altenbecken, Warburg and Hofgeismar to Kassel-Wilhelmshöhe. In Soest there is an additional connection to Dortmund via Werl and Unna. The RE1 (Regionalbahn 1) of the Deutsche Bahn ends or starts in Paderborn and runs via Lippstadt, Soest, Hamm, Dortmund, Essen, Düsseldorf and Cologne to Aachen. This train does not stop at the Geseke station. In Paderborn one can also take the trains to Bielefeld. In bigger stations there are also connections to ICs and ICEs.

=== Neighbouring municipalities ===
- Büren
- Erwitte
- Lippstadt
- Rüthen
- Salzkotten

=== Division of the town ===
After the local government reforms of 1975 Geseke consists of 8 boroughs:

- Geseke (14,451 inhabitants)
- Bönninghausen (105 inhabitants)
- Ehringhausen (1,628 inhabitants)
- Eringerfeld (494 inhabitants)
- Ermsinghausen (70 inhabitants)
- Langeneicke (1,174 inhabitants)
- Mönninghausen (841 inhabitants)
- Störmede (2,316 inhabitants)

== Population ==
Historical population

Year	Pop.	±% p.a.
1965	16,763	—
1970	18,772	+2.29%
1975	20,647	+1.92%
1980	20,310	−0.33%
1985	18,005	−2.38%
1990	17,733	−0.30%
1995	19,170	+1.57%

Year	Pop.	±% p.a.
2000	19,976	+0.83%
2005	20,640	+0.66%
2010	20,755	+0.11%
2015	21,070	+0.30%
2020	21,422	+0.33%
2025	21,013	−0.38%

Source: Landesdatabank Nordrhein-Westfalen

== Landmarks and culture ==
=== Music ===
Geseke has many clubs, especially music clubs, including marching bands, a brass band and a bagpipe band. There is a shanty choir, a church choir (youth choir and adult choir), a Gospel choir and various school choirs. The youth choir of the church has already made several excursions (e.g. to Lübeck, Hamburg or Berlin). The auditorium of the high school is also used for music events.

=== Museums ===
Situated at the Hellweg, the city museum informs about the city's history and provides various facts about Geseke.

=== Monuments, churches and buildings ===
- The Church of St. Peter (city church) that is located directly at the market square, the pedestrian zone and the city park. The church is not always open to the public; during the fairs, however, the opening hours are extended.
- The Church of St. Cyriacus (Collegiate Church) is a pilgrimage church connected to the Virgin Mary.
- Other churches are the Church of St. Mary, a relatively new church, and the monastery church of St. John the Baptist.
- The Old Town Hall contains meeting rooms and the Catholic Library.

=== Squares and Parks ===
Near the town church and the center of the city you will find the city park. There you can sit on benches, walking and indulge in the café Troholte. The house was then Troholte a listed monument or actually just a shack. Now it has been used as a cafe. The park has a playground with various toys and a place where you can use solid sports equipment. Geseke also has a water wheel, which is close to the church. The Geseker pond is also close to this church. In the marketplace there is space for parking and a well. There is also the market place and an ice cream shop, and a bakery, a breakfast cafe and a pharmacy are within easy reach. In the shopping area you will find shoes and clothes, and the Noltenhof is not far from it. The Noltenhof is for parking. Parking is free throughout Geseke. At Disconter Geseke still offers the Edeka, Aldi, Lidl, Netto and Penny. With the SB-market you can get games and movies, at Euronics however televisions and other electronic devices.

=== Events ===
- The "Geseker Gösselkirmes" fair is held on the first Thursday in May. This event is a fun fair with a colorful carousel, lottery booths and food stalls. There is also a parade in which the one sitting on the brightly painted wagons, go behind or simply watch. The school children who march along the way, get free tickets. Therefore, it is very crowded on Saturdays, since the move is the culmination of the event and the children get their free tickets. In addition to the rides and the parade there are still some open-air events.
- At Pentecost, the citizens have their shooters shooting match. (Bürgerschützenfest)
- On the first weekend in July, the Sebastianers shooters have their shooting match. (Sebastianer Schützenfest)
- Lobetag first to find a fair held in the abbey church, then the "Sacred Heart of Jesus" once worn around the wall. There is a huge procession with acolytes, priests and citizens. At the roundabout on the "road Bürener" / B1 is briefly stopped and prayed. There are other points on which is prayed briefly.
- It will also take another procession.
- On the second weekend in June, the "Weinfest" (in English: Wine Festival). Here people can taste and buy wine.
- In September, the "Hexenstadtfest" (in English: Witch City Festival). There are small stalls and food stalls and other attractions.
- In December, the "Weihnachtsmarkt" (in English: Christmas market) is held.
- There are regular pilgrimages in the collegiate church. (Maria Schuss - Mary shot)

=== Education ===
- St. Mary's Primary School
- Dr. Adenauer primary school
- Alfred Delp primary school
- Pancras Primary School in Störmede
- Edith Stein full-time secondary school (Hauptschule in German)
- Dietrich Bonhoeffer Secondary School (Realschule in German)
- Secondary school Geseke (real and main school is summarized in a (secondary) school.) (Since the beginning of the school year 13/14 (2013))
- high school Antonianum (Gymnasium in German)
- School in Eringerfeld
- Municipal Music School

== International relations ==
Geseke is twinned with:

- Loos, France - since 1978

=== Trivia ===
An episode of "Die Super-Nanny" was shot in Geseke (Störmede).

== Notable people ==
- Thomas Bertels (born 1986), German footballer
- Ferdinand Fabra (1906–2007), German football coach
- Josef Marx, called "Jupp" (1934–2008), German footballer, who was once in the year 1960 in the Germany national football team
- Reinhard Cardinal Marx (born 1953), Archbishop of Munich and Freising and since March 2014 chairman of the German Bishops' Conference
- Ingrid Mickler-Becker (born 1942), former German athlete and Olympic athlete
- Dominic Peitz (born 1984), German footballer
- Ludwig Schupmann (1851–1920), professor of architecture and designer of telescopes
