= Dioptrics =

Science of light and lenses

Dioptrics is the branch of optics dealing with refraction, especially by lenses. In contrast, the branch dealing with mirrors is known as catoptrics. Telescopes that create their image with an objective that is a convex lens (refractors) are said to be "dioptric" telescopes.

An early study of dioptrics was conducted by Ptolemy in relation to the human eye as well as refraction in media such as water. The understanding of the principles of dioptrics was further expanded by Alhazen, considered the father of modern optics.

== See also ==
- Diopter (American English) / Dioptre (British English) (unit of measurement)
- Catoptrics (study of and optical systems utilizing reflection)
- Catadioptrics (study of and optical systems utilizing reflection and refraction)
- Optical telescope
- List of telescope types
- Image-forming optical system
