= Mangin mirror =

Catadioptric reflector for search lights

Diagram of a Mangin mirror.

In optics, a Mangin mirror is a negative meniscus lens with the reflective surface on the rear side of the glass forming a curved mirror that reflects light without spherical aberration if certain conditions are met. This reflector was invented in 1874 by a French officer Alphonse Mangin as an improved catadioptric reflector for search lights and is also used in other optical devices.

== Description ==
The Mangin mirror's construction consists of a concave (negative meniscus) lens made of crown glass with spherical surfaces of different radii with the reflective coating on the shallower rear surface. The spherical aberration normally produced by the simple spherical mirror surface is canceled out by the opposite spherical aberration produced by the light traveling through the negative lens. Since light passes through the glass twice, the overall system acts like a triplet lens. The Mangin mirror was invented in 1874 by a French military engineer named Colonel Alphonse Mangin as a substitute for the more difficult to manufacture parabolic reflecting mirror for use in searchlights. Since the catadioptric design eliminated most of the off-axis aberration found in parabolic mirrors, Mangin mirrors had the added advantage of producing a nearly true parallel beam of light. They saw use in the late 19th century as reflectors for naval search lights. Its use in military applications was limited, since glass reflectors of any kind were thought to be too fragile and susceptible to enemy gunfire.

== Applications ==
Example of a catadioptric lens that uses rear surfaced "mangin mirrors" (Minolta RF Rokkor-X 250mm f/5.6)

Mangin mirrors are used in illumination and image forming optics such as search lights, headlamps, aircraft gunsights and head-mounted displays. Many catadioptric telescopes use negative lenses with a reflective coating on the back surface that are referred to as "Mangin mirrors", although they are not single-element objectives like the original Mangin, and some, like the Hamiltonian telescope, predate the Mangin's invention by over 60 years. Catadioptric mirrors similar to the Mangin are found in the Klevtsov–Cassegrain, Argunov–Cassegrain telescopes, and Ludwig Schupmann's Schupmann medial telescope. They are also used in compact catadioptric photographic lens designs that save on mass since aberration can be corrected by the mirror, itself. Mangin mirrors are also used in null correctors, which are used to fabricate large aspheric mirrors.
