= Albert Bouwers =

Dutch optical engineer (1893–1972)

- Born: 23 May 1893; Dalen, Netherlands
- Died: 22 January 1972 (aged 78); Hague, Netherlands
- Education: Universiteit Utrecht
- Known for: Inventing the meniscus telescope
- Spouse(s): Madelon Thérèse Elise Hooij (m. 1923; div. 1946) Olga Winkler (m. 1946–1972)
- Scientific career
- Fields: Optical engineering
- Workplaces: Philips Laboratory
- Thesis: Over het meten der intensiteit van Röntgenstralen (On the Measurement of the Intensity of X-Rays) (1924)
- Doctoral advisor: Leonard Ornstein

Albert A. Bouwers (1893–1972) was a Dutch optical engineer. He is known for developing and working with X-rays and various optical technologies as a high-level researcher at Philips research labs. He is lesser known for patenting in 1941 a catadioptric meniscus telescope design similar to but slightly predating the Maksutov telescope.

== Biography ==
Bouwers was born in the town of Dalen in the Netherlands in 1893. He obtained his Ph.D. from Utrecht University in 1924, with a dissertation entitled in Dutch Over het meten der intensiteit van Röntgenstralen. He was also the director of the Philips Laboratory's X-ray department.

Bouwers developed a night vision device for viewing in low light conditions, called the "night eye". The design used a photosensitive layer of cesium and antimony in a cathode-ray tube, to brighten images by over 1,000 times. Unlike active infrared systems, it did not require an infrared flashlight. The design was initially produced by Olde Delft Optical Company in the Netherlands.

== Bouwers meniscus telescope ==
Albert Bouwers 1941 concentric meniscus telescope

In August 1940, Albert Bouwers built a prototype for a design for a wide field concentric meniscus telescope (patented February 1941) similar to, and slightly predating, Russian optician Dmitri Dmitrievich Maksutov's 1941 Maksutov telescope. War time secrecy kept Bouwers and Maksutov from knowing about each other's designs and Bouwers' design was not published until after World War II.

Bouwers original design (based on an earlier catadioptric telescope, Bernhard Schmidt's "Schmidt camera") had the spherical mirror and spherical "meniscus corrector shell" all with a common radius of curvature (a concentric or monocentric design) resulting in a perfectly spherical symmetry of the whole optical device. Like the Schmidt camera, the meniscus telescope has the aperture stop coincide with the center of curvature. It also shares the Schmidt's curved image plane. The design has an ultrawide field of view with no spherical aberration but does not correct chromatic aberration and was only suitable as a monochromatic astronomical astrographic camera working at a single wavelength of light. Bouwers came up with a later design that used a cemented doublet to form the meniscus corrector shell to correct chromatic aberration.
