= Argunov–Cassegrain telescope =

Catadioptric telescope design

Light path in an Argunov–Cassegrain telescope

The Argunov–Cassegrain telescope is a catadioptric telescope design first introduced in 1972 by P. P. Argunov. All optics are spherical, and the classical Cassegrain secondary mirror is replaced by a sub-aperture secondary corrector group consisting of three air-spaced elements, two lenses and a Mangin mirror (the element furthest from the primary mirror).

== Discussion ==
Argunov systems only employ spherical surfaces and avoid the practical difficulties of making and testing aspheres. However, this benefit is marginal, as it is almost as difficult to make a true zone-free sphere of precise radius of curvature as it is to make an aspheric surface with comparable precision. Furthermore, since multiple surfaces are involved, creating a design with good aberration correction can become very complicated.

== See also ==
- Klevtsov–Cassegrain telescope
- List of telescope types
