= Ludwig Schupmann =

Ludwig Ignaz Schupmann (23 January 1851 in Geseke (Westphalia), Kingdom of Prussia – 2 October 1920 also in Geseke) was a German professor of architecture and an optical designer. He is principally remembered today for his Medial and Brachymedial telescopes, types of catadioptric reflecting-refracting telescopes with Mangin mirrors that eliminate chromatic aberrations while using common optical glasses. Used in early lunar studies, they are used now in double-star work.

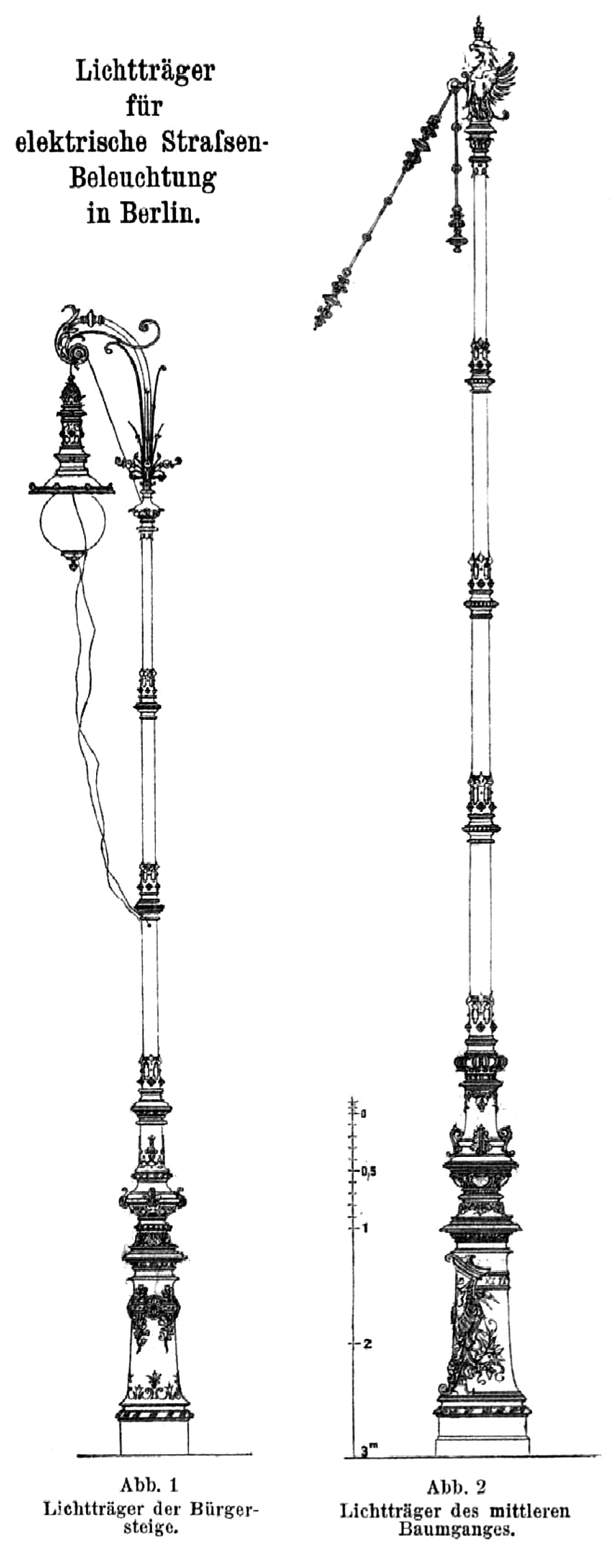
Schupmann's drawing of the candelabra, now named after him.

== Schupmann candelabra (a special street light) ==
In 1882, electric street lighting was put into operation in the center of the city of Berlin (Potsdamer Platz and Leipziger Straße) for which the company Siemens & Halske supplied a total of 36 carbon arc lamps. Schupmann also invented an achromatic lens design using only a single type of glass. The Schupmann dialyte design is highly corrected but limited to long f#'s.

In November 1887, the city of Berlin announced a competition for the design of richly decorated arc lamp candelabras for the boulevard Unter den Linden, which was won by Ludwig Schupmann. A total of 104 lamps with a light point height of 8 metres were built according to this design and installed in Berlin in 1888 (on Unter den Linden, Pariser Platz, Opernplatz and Kaiser-Wilhelm-Straße). Only later, they were named after their creator as Schupmann candelabras.

Before the 1936 Olympic Games, the Schupmann candelabras on the Unter den Linden-boulevard were replaced by so-called Biedermeier Lamps.

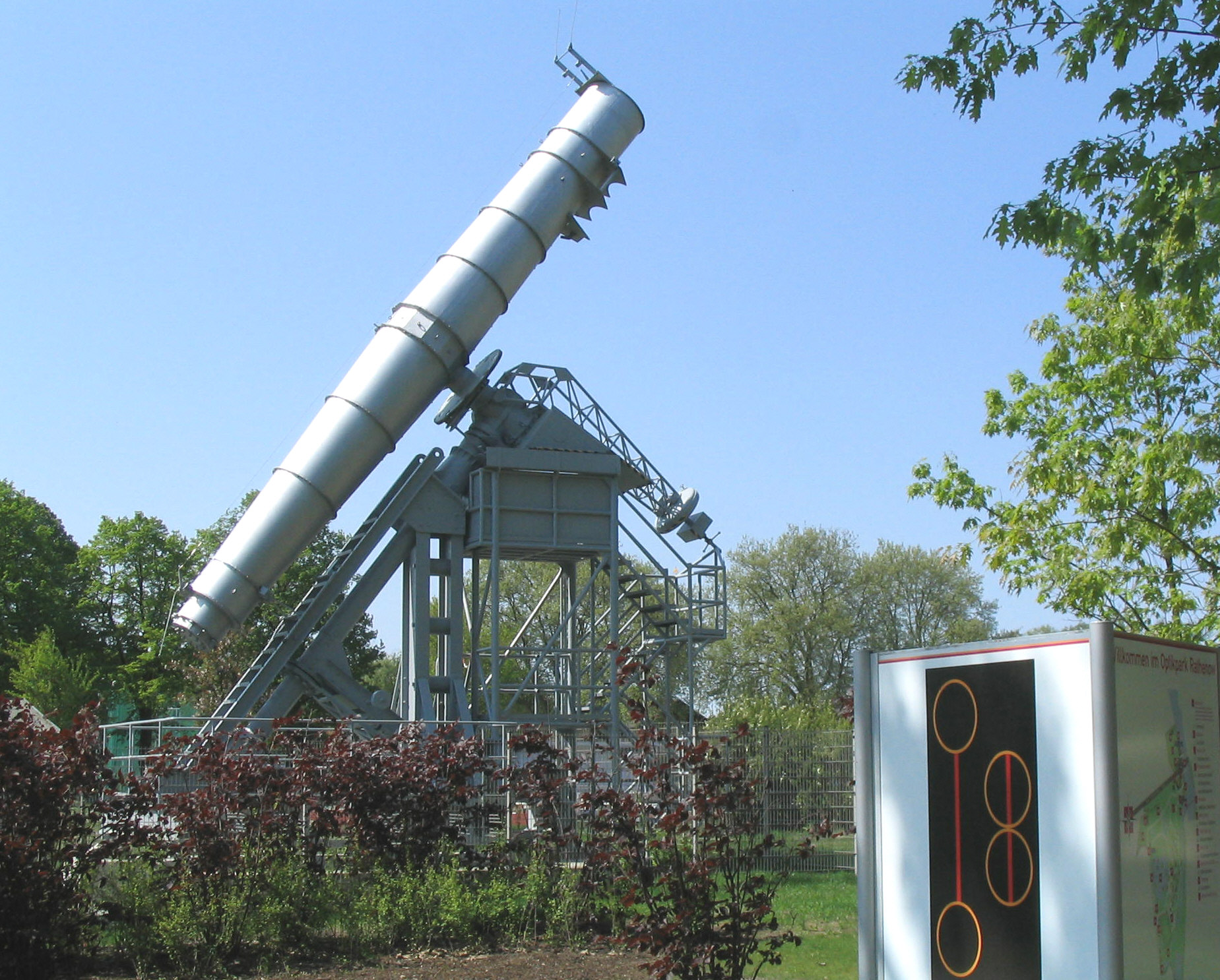
Rathenow's Giant Telescope in the modern "Park of Optics" where it is located since 2009.

== Medial Telescopes ==
Schupmann drafted four types of hybrid telescope made out of lenses and mirrors. He called this "mixed" technology "medial telescope" (from Latin "medium", middle). In the first booklet published in 1899, he presented two types of "medial telescopes" and two variants with shorted tube lengths. The latter were called "brachymedial telescopes" by him. He created the word from the Greek βραχύς (brachys) for "short", so a "brachymedial" for him is a "shortened medial" or "shortened hybrid" telescope.

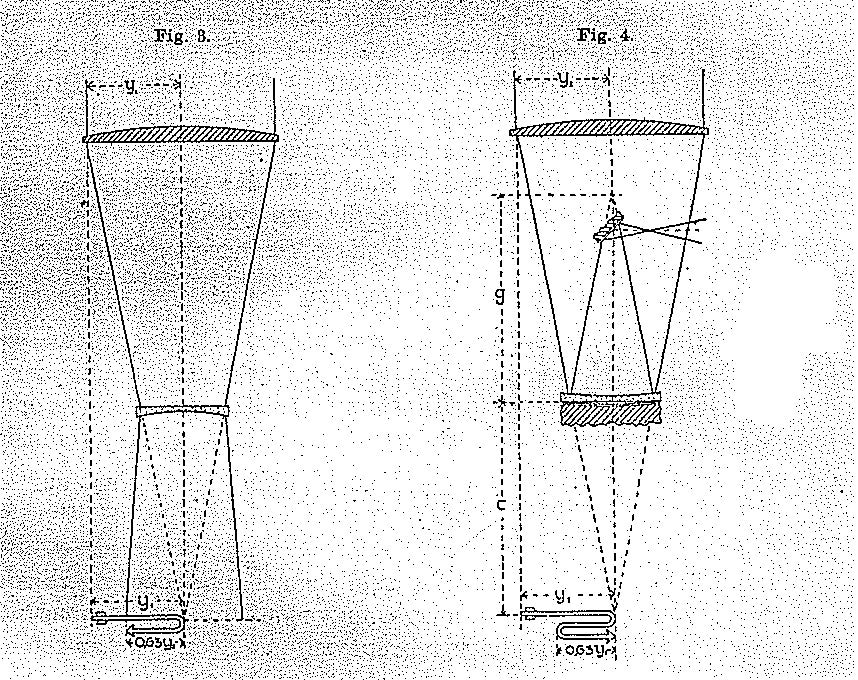
Medial Telescopes (types A and B) according to Schupmann 1899

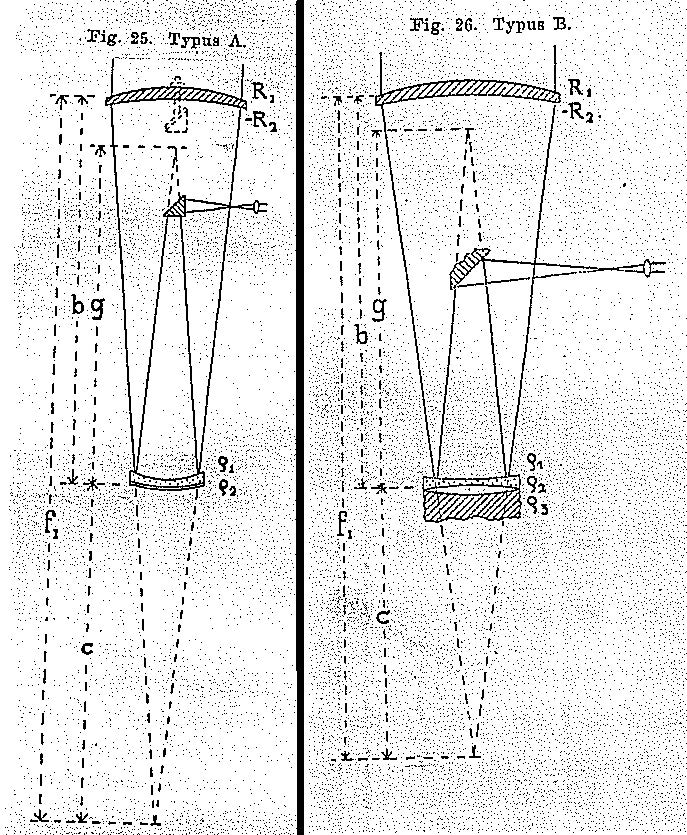
Brachymedial Telescopes (types A and B) according to Schupmann 1899

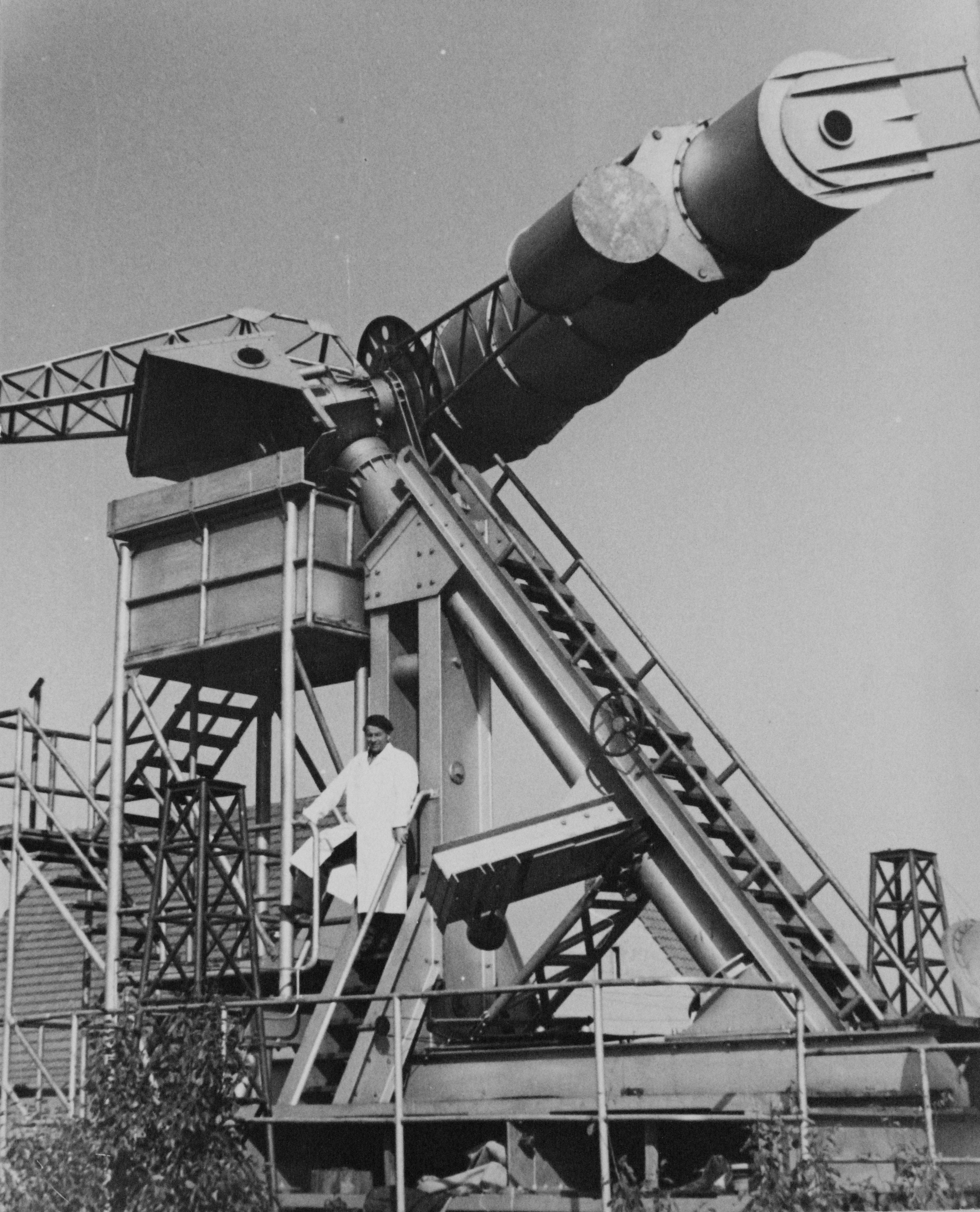
Giant "brachymedial" (shortened hybrid) telescope built in the city of Rathenow near Berlin by Edwin Rolf 1949-1953 (around 1953).

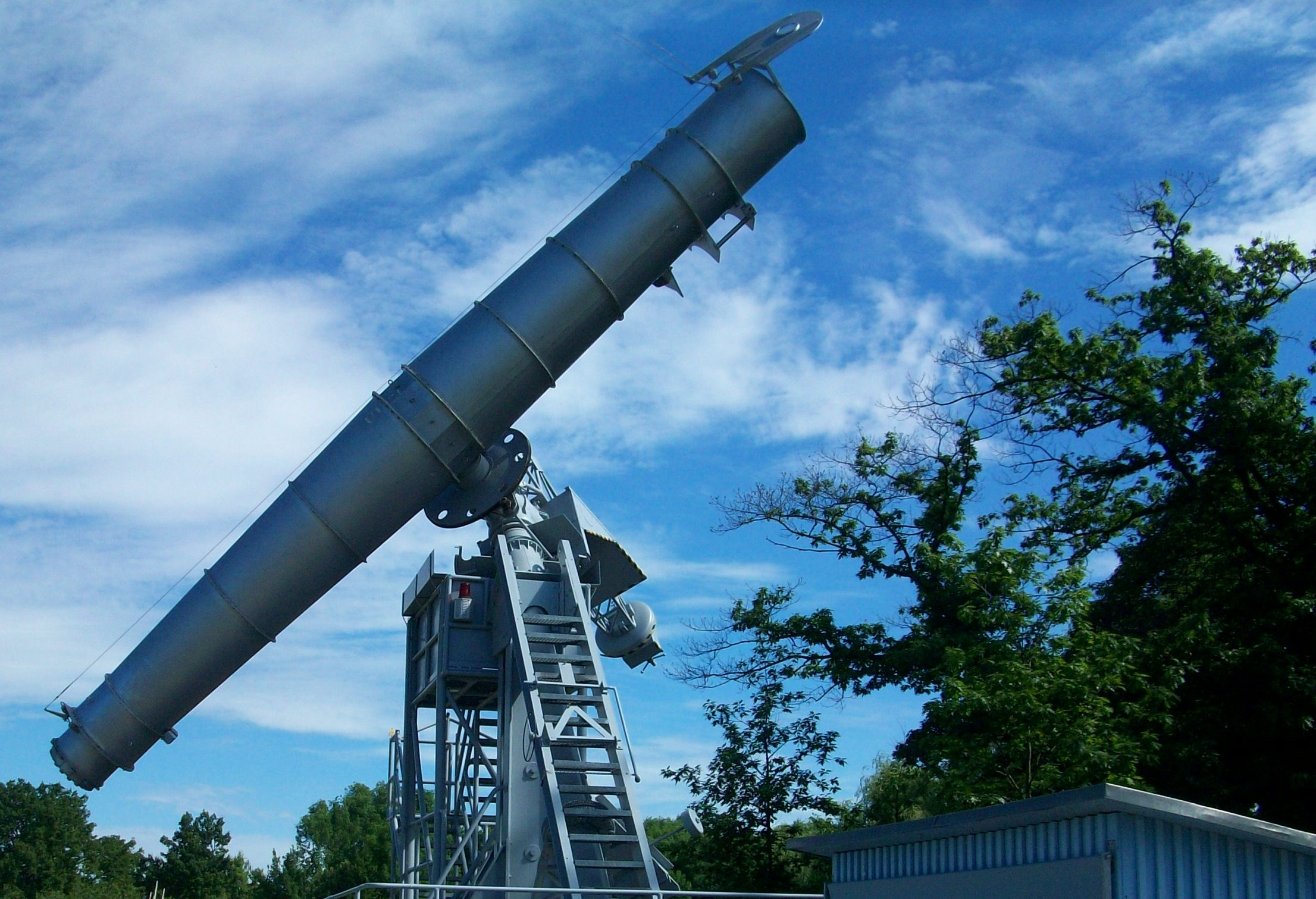
Giant "Shortened Schupmann Medial" telescope in Rathenow, Germany (after 2008).

== Honor ==
The asteroid 5779 Schupmann is named in his honour.†

== Works ==
Die Medial-Fernrohre - Eine neue Konstruktion für große astronomische Instrumente, Teubner-Verlag, 1899
