= Secondary mirror =

Element of a reflecting telescope which focuses light gathered by the primary mirror

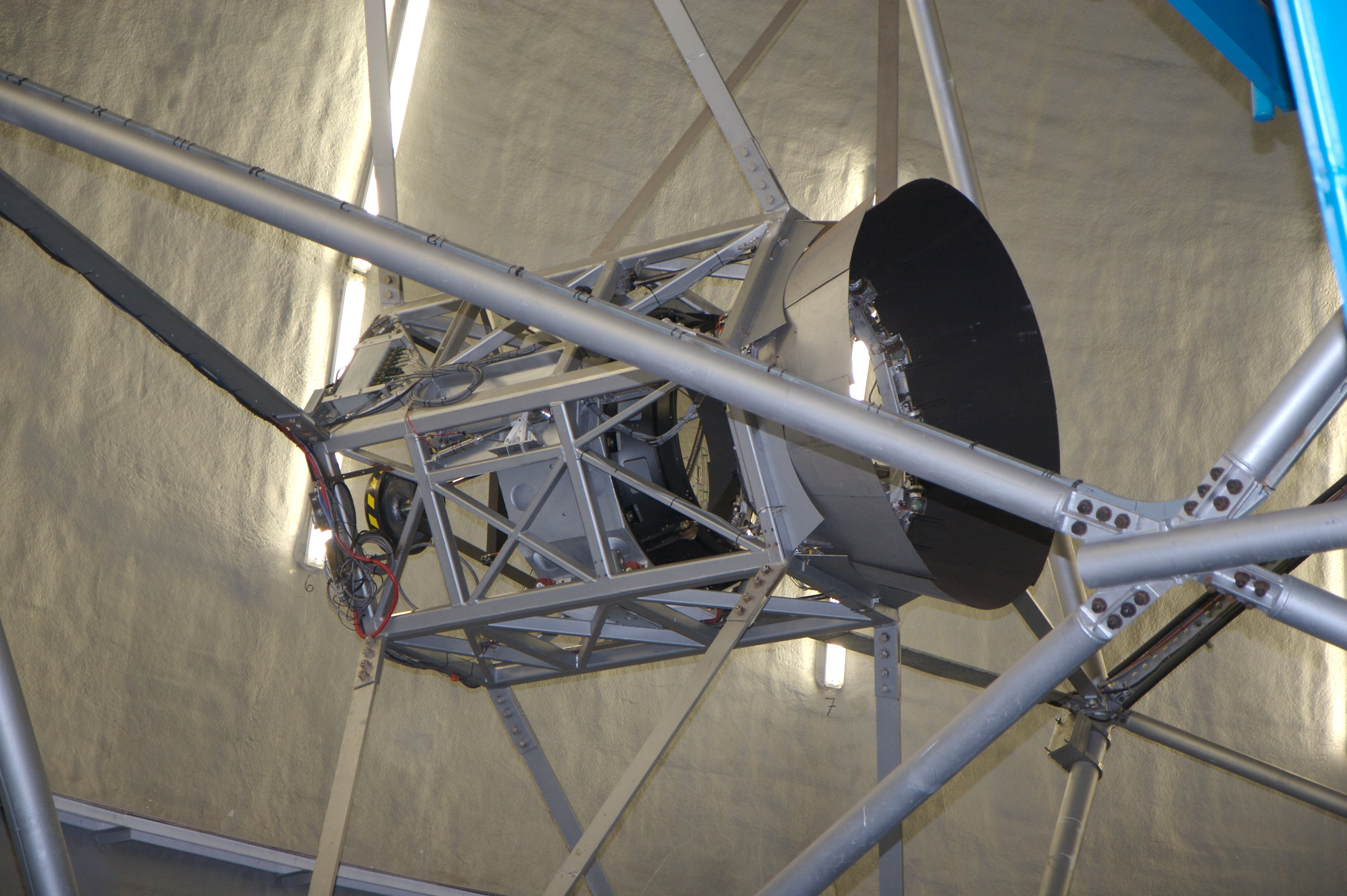
The secondary mirror of Keck Telescope in Hawaii.

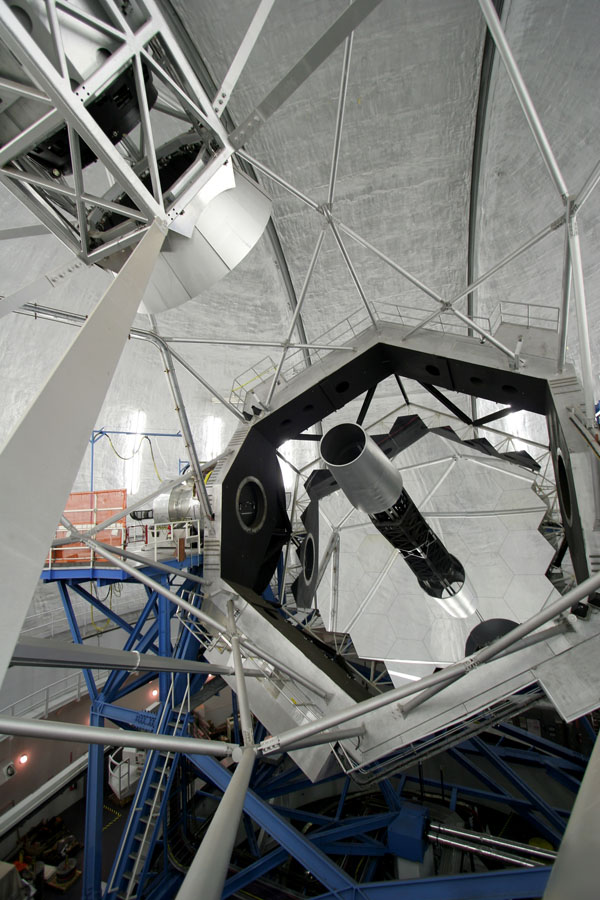
The secondary mirror assembly of the Keck Telescope and its relationship to the primary mirror.

A secondary mirror (or secondary) is the second deflecting or focusing mirror element in a reflecting telescope. Light gathered by the primary mirror is directed towards a focal point typically past the location of the secondary. Secondary mirrors in the form of an optically flat diagonal mirror are used to re-direct the light path in designs such as Newtonian reflectors. They are also used to re-direct and extend the light path and modify the final image in designs such as Cassegrain reflectors.

The secondary is typically suspended by X-shaped struts (sometimes called a "spider") in the path of light between the source and the primary, but can be mounted on other types of mounts or optical elements such as optical windows, or schmidt and meniscus corrector plates. Employing secondary mirrors in optical systems causes some image distortion due to the obstruction of the secondary itself, and distortion from the spider mounts, commonly seen as cross-shaped diffraction spikes radiating from bright stars seen in astronomical images.

For large telescopes, the secondary mirror can reach a significant size. At the Vera C. Rubin Observatory, the secondary for the Simonyi Survey Telescope is nearly four meters in diameter.

== See also ==
- List of telescope parts and construction
- Mirror mount
- Mirror support cell
- Point spread function
- Primary mirror
- Silvering
