= Image-forming optical system =

In optics, an image-forming optical system is a system capable of being used for imaging. The diameter of the aperture of the main objective is a common criterion for comparison among optical systems, such as large telescopes.

The two traditional optical systems are mirror-systems (catoptrics) and lens-systems (dioptrics). However, in the late twentieth century, optical fiber was introduced as a technology for transmitting images over long distances. Catoptrics and dioptrics have a focal point that concentrates light onto a specific point, while optical fiber the transfer of an image from one plane to another without the need for an optical focus.

Isaac Newton is reported to have designed what he called a catadioptrical phantasmagoria, which can be interpreted to mean an elaborate structure of both mirrors and lenses.

Catoptrics and optical fiber have no chromatic aberration, while dioptrics needs to have this error corrected. Newton believed that such correction was impossible, because he thought the path of the light depended only on its color. In 1757 John Dollond made an achromatised dioptric, which was the forerunner of the lenses used in all popular photographic equipment today.

Lower-energy X-rays are the highest-energy electromagnetic radiation that can be focused into an image, using a Wolter telescope. There are three types of Wolter telescopes. Near-infrared is typically the longest wavelength that are handled optically, such as in some large telescopes.
