= Coma (optics) =

Aberration inherent to certain optical designs or due to imperfection in the lens

Coma of a single lens. Each cone of light focuses on different planes along the optical axis.

In optics (especially telescopes), the coma (/ˈkoʊmə/), or comatic aberration, in an optical system refers to aberration inherent to certain optical designs or due to imperfection in the lens or other components that results in off-axis point sources such as stars appearing distorted, appearing to have a tail (coma) like a comet. Specifically, coma is defined as a variation in magnification over the entrance pupil. In refractive or diffractive optical systems, especially those imaging a wide spectral range, coma can be a function of wavelength, in which case it is also a form of chromatic aberration.

== Overview ==
Coma is an inherent property of telescopes using parabolic mirrors. Unlike a spherical mirror, a bundle of parallel rays parallel to the optical axis will be perfectly focused to a point (the mirror is free of spherical aberration), no matter where they strike the mirror. However, this is only true if the rays are parallel to the axis of the parabola. When the incoming rays strike the mirror at an angle, individual rays are not reflected to the same point. When looking at a point that is not perfectly aligned with the optical axis, some of the incoming light from that point will strike the mirror at an angle. This causes an image that is not in the center of the field to appear as wedge-shaped. The further off-axis (or the greater the angle subtended by the point with the optical axis), the worse this effect is. This causes stars to appear to have a cometary coma, hence the name.

Schemes to reduce coma without introducing spherical aberration include Schmidt, Maksutov, ACF and Ritchey–Chrétien optical systems. Correction lenses, "coma correctors" for Newtonian reflectors have been designed to reduce coma. These work by means of a dual lens system of a plano-convex and a plano-concave lens fitted into an eyepiece adaptor which superficially resembles a Barlow lens.

Coma of a single lens or a system of lenses can be minimized (and in some cases eliminated) by choosing the curvature of the lens surfaces to match the application. Lenses in which both spherical aberration and coma are minimized at a single wavelength are called bestform or aplanatic lenses.

== In human vision ==
Vertical coma is the most common higher-order aberration in the eyes of patients with keratoconus. Coma is also a common temporary symptom of corneal injuries or abrasions, in which case the visual defect gradually resolves as the cornea heals.

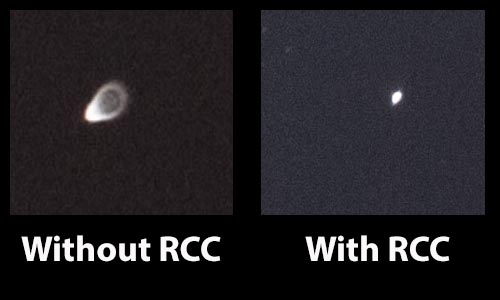
This is a comparison of the coma in an uncorrected f/3.9 Newtonian telescope versus the effects of coma with the Baader Rowe Coma Corrector.

== See also ==
- Optical aberration
- Zernike polynomials
