= Ondokuz Mayıs University Observatory =

Ondokuz Mayıs University Observatory Onfozkus Mayis Üniversitesi Gozlemevi
- Organization: Astronomy and Space Sciences Department; Faculty of Science; Ondokuz Mayıs University
- Location: Samsun, Turkey
- Coordinates: 41°22′06″N 36°12′03″E
- Altitude: 165 m (541 ft)
- Established: June 1, 2006
- Website: gozlemevi.omu.edu.tr

Telescopes
- T14: Meade LX200GPS
- T5: Meade ETX-125

The Ondokuz Mayıs University Observatory (Turkish: Ondokuz Mayıs Üniversitesi Gözlemevi) is a ground-based astronomical observatory operated by the Astronomy and Space Sciences Department at Ondokuz Mayıs University's Faculty of Science. Established on June 1, 2006, it is located within the university campus at a distance of 14 km (8.7 mi) north-west of Samsun, northern Turkey. It is one of the six university observatories in the country.

== Instruments ==
Currently, the observatory consists of following telescopes and instruments:

Telescopes
T14 Meade LX200GPS Schmidt–Cassegrain

- Diameter: 355 mm (14")
- Focal ratio: f/10
- Focal length: 3,550 mm
- Producer: Meade Instruments Corp, California, USA

T5 Meade ETX-125 Maksutov-Cassegrain

- Diameter: 127 mm (5")
- Focal ratio: f/15
- Focal length: 1,900 mm
- Producer: Meade Instruments

Charge-coupled devices
Meade DSI PRO II

- CCD image sensor monochromatic: Sony EXview HAD CCD Sensor (ICX429ALL)

Meade DSI

- CCD sensor: Sony Super HAD Color CCD Sensor
