= ETX =

ETX may refer to:

- ETX (form factor), Embedded Technology eXtended computer-on-module specification
- Meade ETX telescope, popular line of compact Maksutov-Cassegrain telescopes made by Meade Instruments Corporation
- End-of-text character, character code within the C0 and C1 control codes range
- Expected Transmission Count, network routing metric
- ETX Studios, a French public relations firm
- East Texas, East Texas
