= Bresser =

Optical Devices Manufacturer in Germany

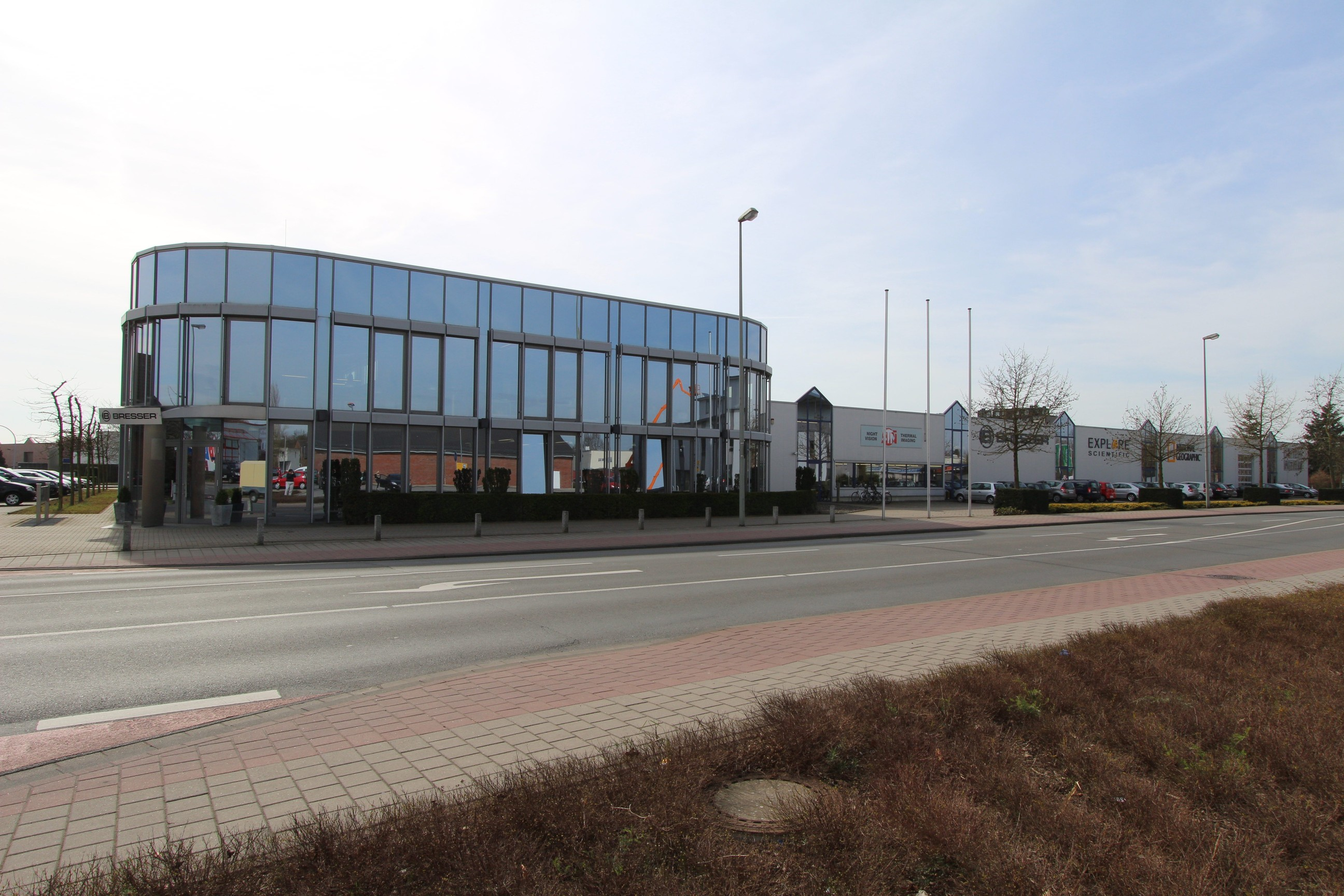
- Bresser corporate headquarters in Rhede, (2014)
- Native name: Bresser GmbH
- Type: GmbH
- Founded: 1957
- Headquarters: Rhede, North Rhine-Westphalia, Germany
- Products: Telescopes, microscopes
- Website: bresser.de

The Bresser Corporation is a Germany-based manufacturer and distributor of optical devices such as binoculars, astronomical telescopes, microscopes. In addition, the company also has a separate consumer electronics division for weather stations and action cameras since 2016. The main supplier for the company is Jinghua Optical & Electronics Co., Ltd. (JOC).

== History ==
Bresser GmbH was founded in 1957 by Josef Bresser, initially focussing on the import and distribution of binoculars. After Josef Bresser's death, his son, Rolf Bresser, took over the management of the company in 1979.

In 1999, Rolf Bresser sold his shares in the company to Meade Instruments Corporation, a leading global manufacturer of astronomical telescopes based in Irvine, California. The company then operated under the name Meade Instruments Europe GmbH. In 2005, the Bresser Messier Line of telescopes, aimed at intermediate astronomy enthusiasts was launched.

In 2009 former owner Rolf Bresser, alongside Helmut Ebbert, the general manager of Meade Instruments Europe GmbH, and a Chinese manufacturer JOC, acquired Meade Instruments Europe GmbH for €9.4 million.

Bresser LLC, a distribution firm in the United States, was established in 2010.

In 2013, company's legal form and name were changed to Bresser GmbH. At the beginning of 2014, Bresser expanded its product range with the takeover of the Dutch photo studio outfitter Folux B.V. Since 2015, Bresser has been the exclusive distributor of the American company Lunt Engineering.

== Products & brands ==
Bresser planetarium projector (2012)

The Bresser Messier series astronomical telescope at 9th Bengaluru Space Expo 2026, BIEC

The Bresser GmbH product portfolio caters to both amateur and professional users, under several specialized brands. These include the Bresser Brand itself (telescopes, microscopes, binoculars, weather stations, and photo studio equipment), Explore Scientific (telescopes and astronomy accessories), National Geographic (optical and outdoor products like binoculars, telescopes and microscopes), PULSAR (night vision and thermal imaging devices), Vixen (telescopes and astronomical equipment, distributed by Bresser in certain regions), Bresser Junior (products for children like telescopes and microscopes), and DieMaus (educational toys inspired by the German TV show Die Sendung mit der Maus).

Bresser GmbH’s product offerings span several key categories:

- Astronomy Equipment: Telescopes, filters, lenses, and domes, with brands such as Bresser, Explore Scientific, Lunt Solar Systems, National Geographic, Pulsar, and Vixen.
- Photo Studio Equipment: Continuous lighting, tripods, and studio flashes, available under the Bresser brand.
- Leisure and Hunting Accessories: Rangefinders, binoculars, night vision devices, thermal imaging cameras, and riflescopes, from brands like Bresser, Lufthansa, National Geographic, Pulsar, Vixen, and Yukon.
- Microscopy: Microscopes and magnifying glasses, primarily from the Bresser and Nexcope brands.
- Weather Stations and Timepieces: Weather stations and watches, from Bresser, Explore Scientific, National Geographic, and Oregon Scientific.
- Other Electronics: 3D printers, action cameras, metal detectors, and wildlife cameras, offered by Bresser, Bounty Hunter, and National Geographic.
