= Explore Scientific =

Explore Scientific LLC
- Type: LLC
- Industry: Imaging/Manufacturing
- Founded: Laguna Hills, California (2008)
- Headquarters: Springdale, Arkansas
- Products: Telescopes, spotting scopes, binoculars, eyepieces and microscopes
- Owner: JourneyNorth Inc. (2014–present)
- Website: www.explorescientific.com

Explore Scientific is a company founded by former Meade Instruments Vice President of Brand Community Scott W. Roberts in 2008. Headquartered in Springdale, Arkansas, the company designs and manufactures telescopes, spotting scopes, binoculars, microscopes and other scientific devices. Products are manufactured in China by JOC and imported. For Europe the Explore Scientific GmbH is responsible for the distribution of these products.

== History ==
During the July 2008 annual Astronomical League Conference Awards banquet in Des Moines, Iowa, the launch of the company was announced by Scott Roberts. In 2009 Explore Scientific became the exclusive distributor of Bresser products in the United States and throughout the Americas. In 2010 Jinghua Optical Electronics Company (JOC) became a partner with Roberts, in 2014 all shares and assets of Explore Scientific LLC were acquired by JourneyNorth Inc. based in the USA.

== Products ==
Some of the products produced or distributed by Explore Scientific include:

- Telescopes: Apochromatic and Achromatic Refractors, Dobsonians, and Maksutov-Newtonian
- Eyepieces
- Filters
- Spotting scopes
- Binoculars
- Digital, Biological, and Stereo viewing microscopes
- Telescopic sights
- Laser Rangefinders

== Recognition ==
On February 28, 2018 the Arkansas Better Business Bureau recognized Explore Scientific LLC as a winner of the 2018 BBB Torch Awards for Ethics. The Torch Awards were designed to honor companies that demonstrate high standards of business practices designed to create trust among employees, customers and their communities.
