= My Sky =

My Sky or 'MySky may mean:

- SKY Network Television's "My Sky" brand DVR
- Mead's mySky telescope control
- MySky Aircraft, an American aircraft manufacturer of the MySky MS One
