= Streptomyces samsunensis =

Scientific classification
- Domain: Bacteria
- Kingdom: Bacillati
- Phylum: Actinomycetota
- Class: Actinomycetia
- Order: Streptomycetales
- Family: Streptomycetaceae
- Genus: Streptomyces
- Species: S. samsunensis

Binomial name
- Streptomyces samsunensis Sazak et al. 2011

Type strain
- DSM 42010, M1463, NRRL B-24803

Species of bacterium

Streptomyces samsunensis is a bacterium species from the genus of Streptomyces which has been isolated from the rhizosphere from the tree Robinia pseudoacacia from the Ondokuz Mayıs University in Samsun in Turkey.

== See also ==
- List of Streptomyces species
