= SkyScout =

The Celestron SkyScout was a model of handheld consumer electronic instrument for astronomical orientation and education, similar to the competitor product mySky by Meade Instruments. The general class of zero-magnification sky-orientation scopes using modern geodesy was made possible by the commercialisation of GPS and other GNSS systems in the early 21st century, and the SkyScout was an early example of such use despite being hampered by technical and price limitations.

== Specifications ==
=== Hardware ===
The SkyScout was a handheld, battery powered device about 7.4" x 4.0" x 2.5", and weighing about 1 pound. It had a viewing port, a 3" x 1" LCD on the side and several buttons for controlling and selecting device functions.

The SkyScout had a 12 channel GPS receiver and orientation sensors (whose accuracy was sensitive to proximity to metal objects, indicated by a horseshoe magnet icon on the display) that measured location and pointing angle.

The LCD screen (known to scratch easily) displayed the name of the object (star, planet, deep sky object, etc.) and other relevant data. An audio presentation was available via earphones on 200 of the most popular celestial objects.

Battery life was short at about one-half hour and the batteries required sleeves (included) to minimise their electromagnetic interference with GPS signal reception.

=== Software ===
From an internal database of some 6,000 celestial objects an object is identified simply by centering it in the device's zero-power optical finder and pressing a button.

The database was expandable with extra plug-in SD data cards. A USB connection was also provided for online updates of the object database and device firmware. Since 1 January 2016, the database and firmware can no longer be updated.

== Usage ==
The SkyScout located celestial objects (trivially including the Earth for ease of accessing audio narration about the planet); the user selected the desired object from the database and red arrows in the viewfinder directed the user to point the viewfinder to the object. The SkyScout also featured a "Tonight's Highlights" mode, leading the user through the night's best objects.

== Product lifecycle ==
=== Release ===
The SkyScout was announced at the January 2006 Consumer Electronics Show, and became available in July 2006. It had an initial retail cost of $675, but was later available at prices as low as $250.

=== End-of-life ===
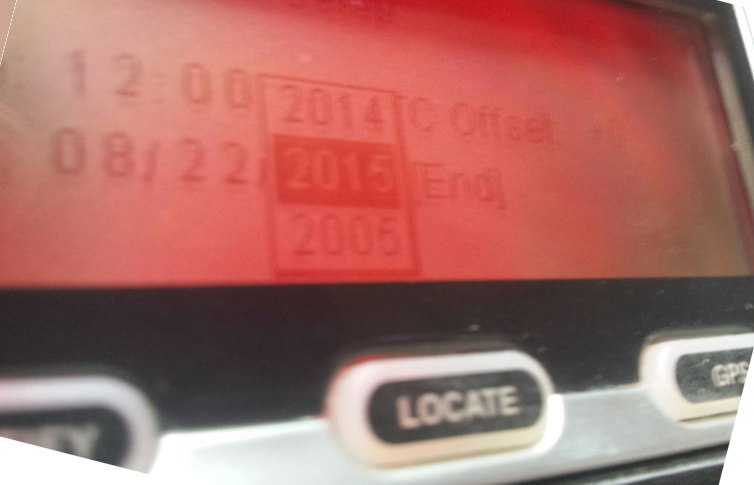
Only the years 2005-2015 are selectable as a valid date in the SkyScout's interface.

The advent of iPhone/Android and associated astronomy apps have somewhat eliminated the need for this device. However, the Skyscout had a low-intensity light system that allowed users' eyes to adapt to the darkness needed for observing stars.

The Celestron SkyScout's database of star and planet positions only extended up to Jan 1, 2016. After this date the SkyScout is not supported by Celestron and no longer works as designed. Because the current date cannot be entered, none of the stars are in the positions that SkyScout indicates if GPS localization is attempted, although of course the stars remain in the same position for time, date and location (the same principle behind a planisphere). Celestron did not indicate this obsolescence date on the product or in the manual. As of April 7, 2019, the Sky Scout can no longer decode the GPS supplied date and time correctly, because of the GPS week number rollover in 2019.

It is possible to enter the latitude/longitude and time/date manually to continuously use the device, pending firmware. If you are running a later version that runs firmware 3.x.x you are able to manual enter coordinates. To do that immediately after turning on and prior to GPS lock press SELECT and then ENTER TIME/LOCATION MANUALLY. The default year 2005 can be selected since it is impossible to choose any year beyond 2015. Given the planisphere principle just cited that the year is unimportant (for all practical purposes) for stars and deep sky objects, these can still be located successfully using this manual setup. Firmware updates are not available anymore on Celetron's website and can be found at Vomitron's Website.
