= Questar Corporation =

Company based in New Hope, Pennsylvania

- Type: Private
- Industry: Manufacturing
- Founded: 1950
- Defunct: 2026
- Headquarters: New Hope, Pennsylvania, United States
- Key people: Donald J. Bandurick, President and CEO
- Products: Optical / mechanical devices
- Website: www.questarcorporation.com

Questar Corporation was a company based in New Hope, Pennsylvania. It manufactured precision optical devices for consumer, industrial, aerospace, and military markets. Its telescopes produced for the consumer market were sold under the brand name "Questar".

== History ==
Questar was founded in 1950 by Lawrence Braymer, who set up Questar to develop and market Maksutov telescopes and other optical devices for the consumer, industrial, and government customers. The Questar Standard telescope has been in production since 1954.

Questars have been associated with many well-known scientists and other personalities; for example, in 1959, Wernher von Braun purchased a telescope manufactured by the company. Johnny Carson, and comedian Tim Allen were avid amateur astronomers and owned Questars.

The company closed unexpectedly on May 4, 2026 and laid off the 3 remaining employees. According to Sky and Telescope magazine, Questar effectively stopped construction new telescopes in 2024 when their mirror supplier, Cumberland Optics ceased operations, focusing on service of existing telescope.

== Products ==
Questar produces telescopes for consumer, military, police, security, aerospace, and industrial applications. Products sold by Questar include 3.5” (89 mm) and 7” (178 mm) aperture Maksutov Cassegrain astronomical/terrestrial telescopes for the consumer market. For a while they also offered 12-inch (300 mm)-aperture optical-tube assemblies. They are used in astronomy, nature study, radar calibration/boresighting/tracking rocket launches, surveillance, and as long-distance microscopes.

Questar does not produce their own optics. The earliest Questar's used optics produced in part by Cave Optical, but for most of their history the optics were produced by Cumberland Optical prior to shutting down in 2024.

=== The Questar 3-1/2" Maksutov Cassegrain ===
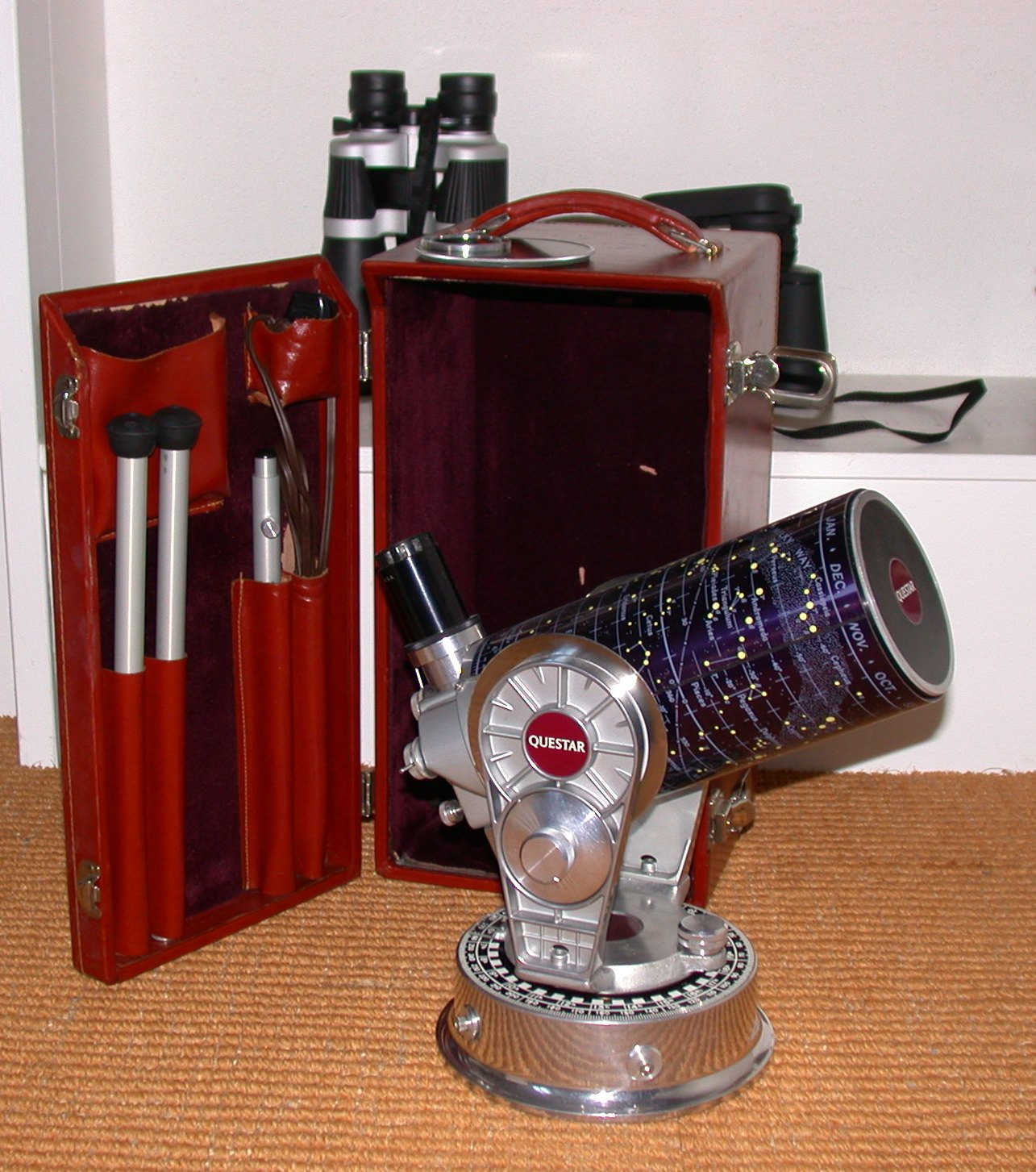
Questar Standard 3 ½”

In development since 1946, the Questar 3-1/2 has been the company's most notable product. Braymer's basic concept for the telescope was one of portability, compactness, and ease of use. He used a catadioptric Maksutov design, named after its inventor Dmitry Maksutov, for the optical tube assembly. Braymer used a modified Cassegrain design that added an aluminized spot to the Maksutov corrector plate, creating a compact folded light path (this design is sometimes called a "Spot-Maksutov"). Braymer designed a built-in "Control Box" that allowed the user, looking through the main eyepiece, to switch between the main telescope and a coaxial finderscope via moving a diagonal out of the way with a flick of a knob. This also allowed a camera or other device to access the focal plane through a hole on the back of the Control Box. A knob for focus and another to switch in and out a magnification-doubling Barlow lens rounded out the controls. The cast-aluminum double-fork arm mount was designed with a built-in clock drive and became equatorial by adding the collapsible legs included. It also included a star chart engraved in white on a blue aluminum sleeve (this doubles as a dewcap), around the barrel which contained a moon map.

To avoid a conflict with a design patent held by John Gregory licensed to PerkinElmer, Braymer put the secondary spot on the outer (R1) surface of the corrector lens. In the mid-1960s the patent issue was settled, and Questar’s Maksutov-Cassegrains after that time use the Gregory design with the aluminized spot on the inside of the corrector (R2). The design was originally envisioned as a 5-inch (130 mm) telescope, but it was decided a telescope of that size would not fit the market they were aiming for, since it would be too heavy and expensive.

The Questar 3.5" entered commercial production in 1954 with ads for the model run in many astronomy, science, photography, and nature related magazines such as National Geographic, Scientific American, and Sky & Telescope. The ads focused on the telescope's mechanical and optical design, educational value for children, ease of use, and adaptations as a spotting scope and telephoto lens. The Questar of the 1950s and early 1960s had a proprietary screw in eyepiece design and offered little capacity to employ third-party accessories. Later models accept standard slide-in 1.25" eyepieces and other accessories.

The Questar 3.5" has been sold in variants including:

- The 3.5" Standard model, with non-removeable optical tube and control box, the predominant model.
- A 3.5" Field Model Questar, which is just the optical tube. See duplex option below. This was first offered for sale in May 1956.
- A 3.5" Duplex, optically and mechanically identical to the Standard, but which included a simple way of detaching the telescope from the open fork mount to allow the optical tube assembly (OTA) to be used as a 1240 mm at f12 telephoto lens. This variant has been in production since 1967.
- A 3.5" convertible model that came with two barrels: the standard one, and a separate longer barrel, which could be screwed onto the duplex fork mount in place of the standard one, and used as a distance microscope. This variant came with the standard accessories, and a separate case containing the distance microscope barrel assembly.
- A 3.5" Questar Birder. This is a modified Questar Field Model with a fixed 10x finder with a rapid-focus knob used for observing birds and other wildlife.

For use in the field of amateur astronomy where resolution and light-gathering power are the primary requirements for a telescope, the Questar 3-1/2's comparatively small aperture has led the instrument to be criticized by some as too small and too expensive.

=== The Questar Seven Maksutov Cassegrain ===
A 7-inch (180 mm) model was introduced in 1967 for amateur and professional astronomers, hobbyists, industry and government. A scaled-up version of the Questar 3.5" with the integrated Control Box, the Questar Seven, with a nominal 2400mm focal length, has twice the aperture and four times the light gathering power of the 3.5. The form-factor is similar to the 3.5 Duplex model as the barrel is separate but attaches to the base of the clock drive assembly. After over fifty years in production, the Seven remains rare. Using a sequential serial numbering system, approximately one thousand units have been built since production began. The Seven was also very expensive for its intended market and has never been a big seller.
