= Maksutov telescope =

Catadioptric telescope design

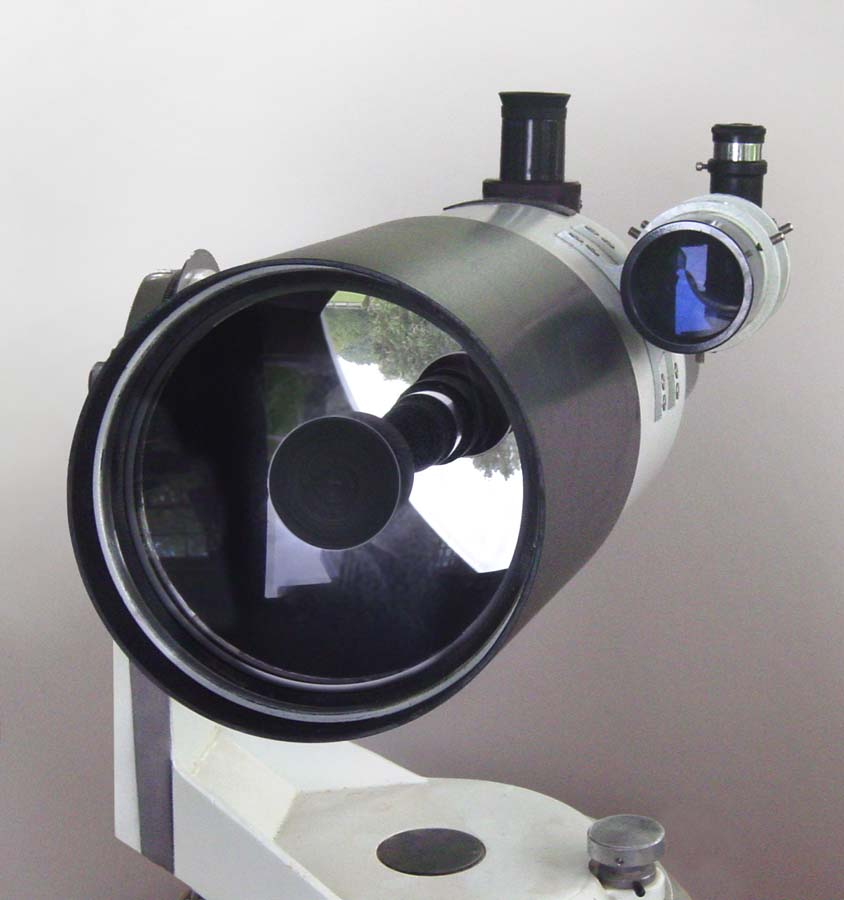
A 150mm aperture Maksutov–Cassegrain telescope

The Maksutov (also called a Maksutov–Cassegrain or "Mak" telescope) is a catadioptric telescope design that combines a spherical mirror with a weakly negative meniscus lens in a design that takes advantage of all the surfaces being nearly "spherically symmetrical". The negative lens is usually full diameter and placed at the entrance pupil of the telescope (commonly called a "corrector plate" or "meniscus corrector shell"). The design corrects the problems of off-axis aberrations such as coma found in reflecting telescopes while also correcting chromatic aberration. It was patented in 1941 by Soviet optician Dmitri Dmitrievich Maksutov. Maksutov based his design on the idea behind the Schmidt camera of using the spherical errors of a negative lens to correct the opposite errors in a spherical primary mirror. The design is most commonly seen in a Cassegrain variation, with an integrated secondary, that can use all-spherical elements, thereby simplifying fabrication. Maksutov telescopes have been sold on the amateur market since the 1950s.

== Invention ==
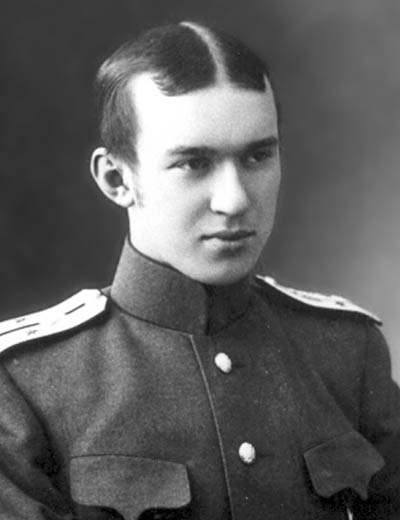
Dmitry Dmitrievich Maksutov

Dmitri Maksutov may have been working with the idea of pairing a spherical primary mirror in conjunction with a negative meniscus lens as far back as 1936. His notes from that time on the function of Mangin mirrors, an early catadioptric spotlight reflector consisting of negative lens with silvering on the back side, include a sketch of a Mangin mirror with the mirror part and the negative lens separated into two elements. Maksutov seems to have picked up the idea again in 1941 as a variation on an earlier design that paired a spherical mirror with a negative lens, Bernhard Schmidt's 1931 "Schmidt camera". Maksutov claimed to have come up with the idea of replacing the complex Schmidt corrector plate with an all-spherical "meniscus corrector plate" while riding in a train of refugees from Leningrad. Maksutov is described as patenting his design in May, August, or October 1941 and building a "Maksutov–Gregorian"-style prototype in October 1941. Maksutov came up with the unique idea using an "achromatic corrector", a corrector made of a single type of glass with a weak negative meniscus shape that departed from the pure concentric spherical symmetrical shape to correct chromatic aberration.

Similar independent meniscus telescope designs were also patented in 1941: Albert Bouwers (his 1941 concentric meniscus telescope), K. Penning and Dennis Gabor (a catadioptric non-monocentric design). Wartime secrecy kept these inventors from knowing about each other's designs, leading to each being an independent invention.

== Derivative designs ==
Maksutov's 1944 design was the first-published meniscus telescope design, and was published in the widely-read Journal of the Optical Society of America. This led to professional and amateur designers almost immediately experimenting with variations, including Newtonian, Cassegrain, and wide-field camera designs.

=== Maksutov–Cassegrains ===
There are many Maksutov designs that use a Cassegrain configuration, mounting a convex secondary mirror near the focus of the primary mirror. Most types use full-aperture correctors and are therefore not very large, since the corrector plate rapidly becomes prohibitively large, heavy and expensive as the aperture increases, with very long cool-down times to reach optimal optical performance. Most commercial manufacturers usually stop at 180 mm (7 in).

==== Gregory or "spot" Maksutov–Cassegrains ====
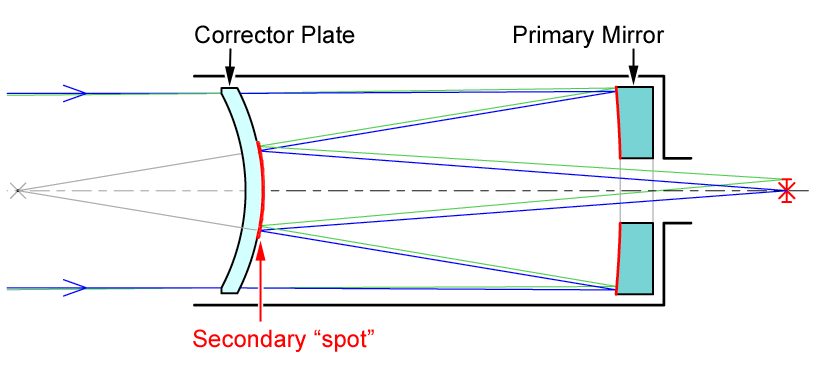
Light path in a typical "Gregory" or "spot" Maksutov–Cassegrain.

Maksutov's design notes from 1941 explored the possibility of a 'folded' Cassegrain-type construction with a secondary silvered "spot" on the convex side of the meniscus facing the primary mirror. He thought this would create a sealed and rugged optical system suitable for use in schools. This design appeared commercially in Lawrence Braymer's 1954 Questar telescope and in PerkinElmer designer John Gregory's competing patent for a Maksutov–Cassegrain. Commercial use of Gregory's design was explicitly reserved for Perkin–Elmer but was published as an amateur telescope design in a 1957 issue of Sky and Telescope in f/15 and f/23 variations. Most Maksutovs manufactured today are this type of 'Cassegrain' design (called either a "Gregory–Maksutov" or "Spot-Maksutov") that use all-spherical surfaces and have, as secondary, a small aluminized spot on the inner face of the corrector. This has the advantage of simplifying construction. It also has the advantage of fixing the alignment of the secondary and eliminates the need for a 'spider' that would cause diffraction spikes. The disadvantage is that, if all spherical surfaces are used, such systems have to have focal ratios above f/15 to avoid aberrations. Also, a degree of freedom in correcting the optical system by changing the radius of curvature of the secondary is lost, since that radius is the same as that of the rear meniscus face. Gregory himself, in a second, faster (f/15) design, resorted to aspherization of the front corrector surface (or the primary mirror) in order to reduce aberrations. This has led to other designs with aspheric or additional elements to further reduce off-axis aberration. This type of Maksutov-Cassegrain's high focal ratio and narrower field of view makes them more suitable for lunar and planetary imaging and any other type of observing where a narrow field high power view is a plus, such as resolving tightly packed globular clusters and double stars.

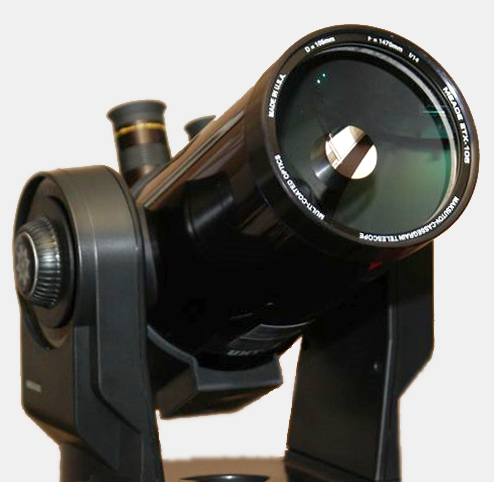
Meade ETX "spot" Maksutov–Cassegrain.

Early amateur astronomical types were introduced in the 1950s by the Questar Corporation. The mid-1970s saw the introduction of mass-produced models by some of the major commercial manufacturers. Low-cost Russian and Chinese mass-production has resulted in price competition. Many manufacturers currently produce Maksutov–Cassegrains, such as Explore Scientific, Intes, Intes-Micro, LOMO, Orion Optics, Telescope Engineering Company (TEC), Vixen, the Meade Instruments's ETX line, and the Synta Taiwan produced Celestron, Sky-Watcher and Orion Telescopes lines.

The spot Maksutov–Cassegrain design has been used extensively in military, industrial, and aerospace applications. Since all of the optical elements can be permanently fixed in alignment and the tube assembly can be environmentally sealed, the design is extremely rugged. That makes it ideal for tracking, remote viewing, and radar calibration / boresighting, where instruments are subjected to severe environments and high g-forces.

==== Rutten Maksutov–Cassegrains ====
Light path in a typical Rutten Maksutov–Cassegrain.

The Rutten Maksutov–Cassegrain (also called a Rumak) has a separate secondary mirror mounted on the inner surface of the meniscus corrector, sometimes similar to the corrector/mirror holder configurations found in commercial Schmidt–Cassegrains. This provides an extra degree of freedom in correcting aberration by changing the curvature of the corrector and the secondary independently. Specifically it allows the designer to aspherize the secondary to provide a much wider flat field than traditional spot Maksutovs, with less off-axis coma. Mounting the secondary on the corrector also limits diffraction spikes. This version is named after the work of Dutch optical designer Harrie Rutten.

==== Sub-aperture corrector Maksutov–Cassegrains ====
Light path in a typical sub-aperture Maksutov–Cassegrain.

Maksutov noted in his designs that instead of using a full-aperture corrector, a small sub-aperture corrector could be placed in the converging light cone of the primary mirror and achieve the same effect. In the 1980s Dave Shafer and Ralph W. Field came out with sub-aperture Cassegrain designs based on this idea. The design reduces the mass and "cool-down time" of a full-aperture corrector. It has the drawbacks of an open, unsealed tube and requires a spider assembly to hold the secondary mirror and corrector, which inevitably affects image quality through diffraction artifacts. Also since the light passes through the corrector twice, the number of surfaces involved is increased, making it difficult to achieve good aberration correction.

=== Maksutov–Newtonians ===
Maksutovs optics can be used in Newtonian configurations that have minimal aberration over a wide field of view, with one-fourth the coma of a similar standard Newtonian and one-half the coma of a Schmidt-Newtonian. Diffraction can also be minimized by using a high focal ratio with a proportionally small diagonal mirror mounted on the corrector, allowing this design to achieve contrast and image quality approaching that of unobstructed high-end refractors (although with some vignetting when used photographically). Like the Maksutov–Cassegrain, the overall diameter of the optical system is limited, due to the mass of the corrector plate.

=== Maksutov cameras ===
The Maksutov system can be used in a prime-focus ultra-wide-field astronomical camera design similar to the Schmidt camera. Like the Schmidt camera, the Maksutov camera has a curved focal plane.

== See also ==
- List of telescope types
- Timeline of Russian innovation
- Schmidt–Cassegrain telescope – Type of catadioptric telescope
