= Meade LX90 =

Telescope

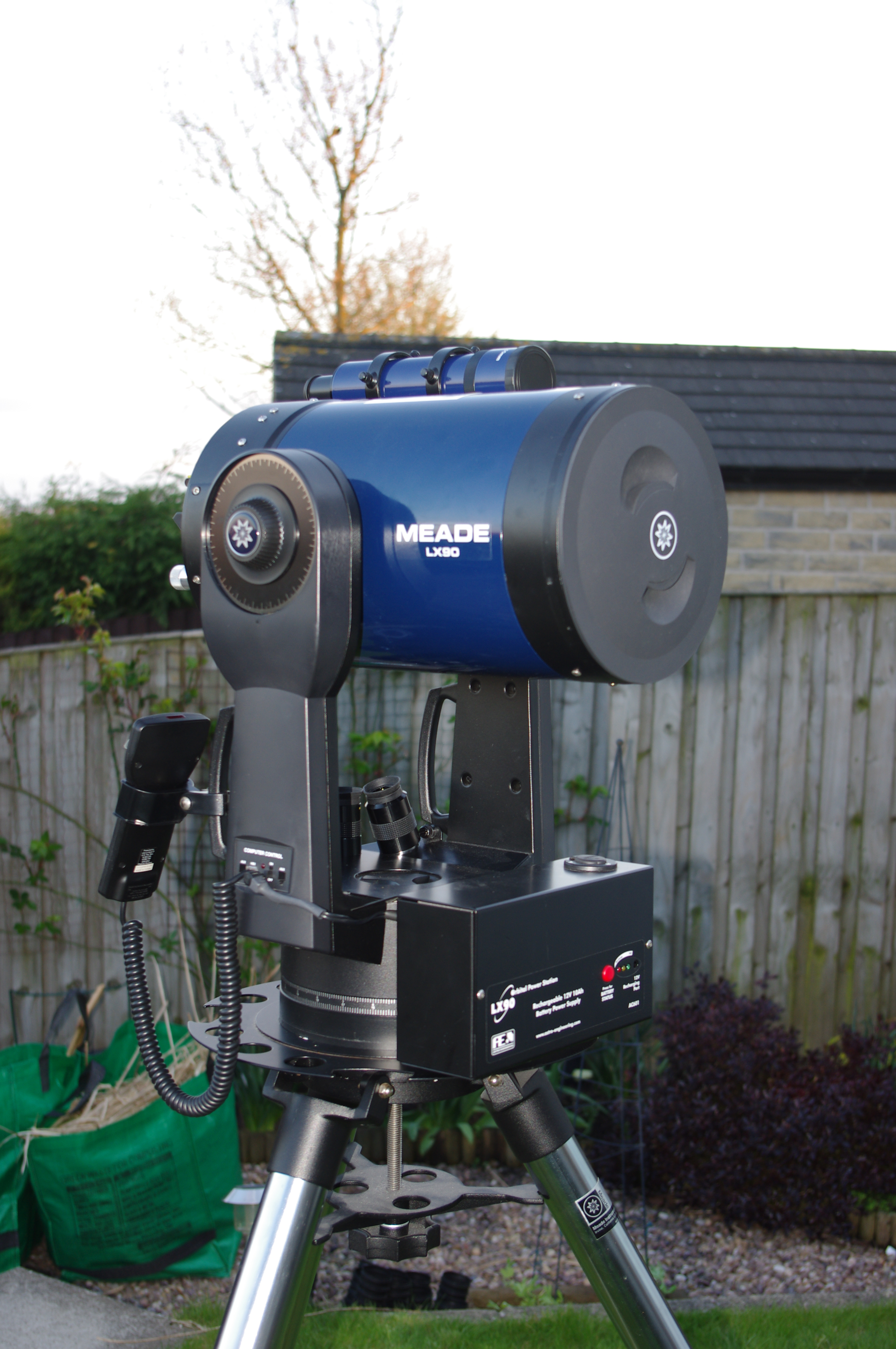
- Meade LX90
- Website: www.meade.com/products/telescopes/lx90.html

The Meade LX90 is a Schmidt-Cassegrain design of telescope made by Meade Instruments for the mid-priced (2000 USD circa 2008) commercial telescope market. It uses a similar optical system to the bigger and more expensive Meade LX200—although it lacks some useful functions like primary mirror locking. The LX90 telescopes were equipped with Autostar soon after its 1999 introduction by Meade instruments. Optical apertures included in the product line included 8 (20 cm), 10 (25 cm) and 12 (30 cm) inches on a double tine fork mount and Autostar system.
