= Dmitry Dmitrievich Maksutov =

Soviet optical engineer and amateur astronomer

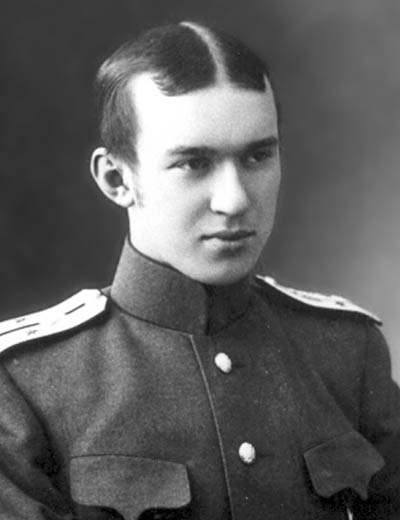
- Maksutov in 1916
- Born: 23 April [O.S. 11 April] 1896; Nikolayev or Odesa, Russian Empire
- Died: 12 August 1964 (aged 68); Leningrad, Soviet Union
- Occupations: Optical engineer, Amateur astronomer
- Known for: Inventor of the Maksutov telescope

Dmitry Dmitrievich Maksutov (Russian: Дми́трий Дми́триевич Максу́тов; 23 April [O.S. 11 April] 1896 – 12 August 1964) was a Soviet optical engineer and amateur astronomer. He is best known as the inventor of the Maksutov telescope.

== Biography ==
Dmitry Dmitriyevich Maksutov was born in 1896 in either Nikolayev or the port city of Odesa, Russian Empire. His father, was a naval officer serving with the Black Sea Fleet, who came from a family with a long and distinguished naval tradition. His great-grandfather, Peter Ivanovich Maksutov, was given the title of prince, thereby raising the family to hereditary nobility as a reward for bravery in combat. His grandfather, Dmitri Petrovich Maksutov, was the last Russian governor of Russian Alaska, before it was purchased by the United States in 1867.

Dmitri became interested in astronomy in early childhood, and constructed his first telescope (a 7.2 inch / 180 mm reflector) when he was twelve years old. Later he read publications by the Russian optician Alexander Andreevich Chikin (1865–1924), who became his teacher. He constructed a much better 8.27 inch (210 mm) reflector and began serious astronomical observation. At 15 years of age he had already been accepted as a member of the Russian Astronomical Society. Three years later he graduated from the Military Nikolayev Engineering Institute in what was then Petrograd (a.k.a. Saint Petersburg, Russia), now the Saint Petersburg Military Engineering-Technical University. Between 1921 and 1930 he worked at the Physics Institute of the University of Odessa in the field of astronomical optics.

In 1930 Maksutov established the Laboratory of Astronomical Optics at the State Optical Institute of Leningrad and led it until 1952. This laboratory was one of the leading astronomical research groups in the USSR. While there he published Анаберрационные отражающие поверхности и системы и новые способы их испытания [Aberration-free reflective surfaces and systems and new methods of testing them] (1932), in which he analyzed aplanatic double mirror systems and introduced the compensating method, which he proposed as early as 1924. This became the main control method of mirror study along with the shadow method.

In 1944 he became a professor as a result of his paper, and from 1946 a Corresponding Member of the USSR Academy of Sciences. From 1952 he worked in Pulkovo Observatory. Maksutov died in what was then Leningrad (a.k.a. Saint Petersburg) in 1964.

== Inventions ==
Cassegrain version of the Maksutov telescope

Maksutov's most well known contribution in the field of optics was made in 1941, when he invented the Maksutov telescope. Like the Schmidt telescope, the Maksutov corrects for spherical aberration by placing a corrector lens in front of the primary mirror. However, where the Schmidt uses an aspheric corrector at the entrance pupil, Maksutov's telescope uses a deeply curved full diameter negative meniscus lens (a "meniscus corrector shell"). He published the design in 1944 in a paper entitled "Новые катадиоптрические менисковые системы" [New catadioptric meniscus systems]. This method was adopted not only by his own laboratory for many of the most important observatories in the Soviet Union, but also internationally. Several commercial telescope-making companies produce Maksutovs, including Celestron, Meade, and Questar.

He created many objective lenses, mirrors, and prisms of various sizes and purposes. He also created a photo-gastrograph (used for photographing the stomach), a needle-microscope, shadow instruments for aerodynamic tubes, telescopic spectacles, and other instruments.

== Awards ==
- Stalin Prize (1941, 1946)
- two Orders of Lenin (1945,1958)
- Order The Badge of Honour (1943)
- Grand Prix at the Expo '58 in Brussels

== See also ==
- List of astronomical instrument makers
- Albert Bouwers – in 1940 independently invented a meniscus telescope similar to the Maksutov
