= MySky =

My Sky was a personal astronomy tool made by Meade Instruments. When pointed at an area of sky, it was supposed to identify objects based on its built-in database of 30000 objects. It also claimed it could guide the user to a particular object from its database. It has an LCD, unsuccessfully incorporates GPS technology and cannot be linked to a compatible Meade computer-controllable telescope. Note, however, that my Sky is not a telescope or observing instrument.

The later model of this device no longer incorporated the GPS functionality. There were many complaints about that feature not working. Now, latitude and longitude are entered manually or selected from a list of cities.

== See also ==
- SkyScout
