= ETX Studios =

French public relations firm

- Type: anonymous Partnership
- Industry: public relations, news agency
- Founded: 1998
- Headquarters: Paris, France
- Key people: Jérôme and Pierre Doncieux, Co-presidents; Habert Dassault Finance shareholder Angel Invest, shareholder the Business Angels Club, shareholder Xavier Dupont, shareholder Matthieu Pigasse, shareholder François Veron shareholder
- Revenue: 5.1 million € (2007)
- Owners: The Doncieux brothers,
- Number of employees: 38 employees, 100 freelance workers and 300 correspondents worldwide (2007)
- Website: etxstudio.com

ETX Studio, formerly known as Relaxnews is a French public relations firm which provides advertorial content to news providers.

== History ==
Relaxnews was founded in Paris in 1998 by Pierre Doncieux, former editor-in-chief and associate editor of Vogue for men, Lui and VSD. Jérôme Doncieux, former Executive Director of Euro RSCG France, and Director of the Association of Agencies-advice in Communication ( AACC), joined his brother in the business in 2000.

Member of the French Federation of News Agencies, Relaxnews is the first French news agency to be dedicated to leisure news. The company has specialized in this field to meet the high demand for lifestyle and leisure news. According to a survey conducted by the Opinion Way Institute in May 2006, 79% of the French population is interested in news about leisure.

, The company has received the RIAM Label which rewards innovative multimedia and audiovisual projects. Relaxnews’ project “Relaxmultimedia”, has been realized with the contribution of the international news agency AFP (Agence France Presse) and the University of la Rochelle.

== Products ==
- The "relaxwire"

Launched in 2006, the relaxwire is the first newswire about leisure news. It covers four leisure categories: well-being, home, entertainment and tourism. In 2009, Relaxnews partnered with AFP to form the newswire AFP-Relaxnews.

- The "relax adhoc"

The division focuses on editorial content (concepts, texts, pictures) as well as the production of customized pages, articles, dossiers, supplements and special issues. All the content is available for print, web or mobile use.
