= John F. Gregory =

American optical engineer and popularizer of amateur telescope making

- Born: 1927; Cleveland, Ohio
- Died: 14 November 2009; Austin, Texas
- Occupation: Optical engineer
- Employer: Perkin-Elmer Corporation
- Spouse: Carolyn

John F. Gregory (1927–November 14, 2009) was an American optical engineer and a popularizer of amateur telescope making. He is credited with the design of a version of the Maksutov telescope called the "Gregory-Maksutov telescope".

== Career ==
John Gregory was born in Cleveland, Ohio, in 1927. He earned bachelor's and master's degrees in engineering from the Case Institute of Technology (now Case Western Reserve University). In the 1950s, he began his career at Perkin-Elmer Corporation in Norwalk, Connecticut. In the 1960s, he worked for Barnes Engineering Company in Stamford, Connecticut, where he designed and tested lenses used in the infrared and ultraviolet. In 1974, he became chief engineer for the University of Texas McDonald Observatory. In 1978, he left the observatory and opened Gregory Optics, an optical and telescope equipment consulting, design, and fabrication firm.

== The Gregory-Maksutov telescope ==
In 1957, Gregory published an article in Sky & Telescope magazine entitled "A Cassegrainian-Maksutov Telescope Design for the Amateur". In it, Gregory showed how to construct a version of the Maksutov catadioptric telescope, in which all optical surfaces are spherical, and has a small secondary aluminized spot on the inner surface of the corrector lens. Not only was Gregory's design simpler than the classical Maksutov design, but it also had the advantage of fixing the alignment of the secondary. This made the telescope more robust, eliminating the need for a secondary support that would otherwise cause diffraction spikes in the image. Most Maksutov telescopes manufactured today are of this type, which is now either called "Gregory-Maksutov" or a "Spot-Maksutov".

Gregory's article included detailed optical specifications as well as shop techniques and testing algorithms. Many more articles were published by Gregory and others on his design in the "Gleanings for ATMs" column in Sky & Telescope, culminating in the 39-page pamphlet Gleanings Bulletin C.

Gregory went on to design a 22-inch f/3.7 Maksutov telescope for the Stamford Museum and Nature Center in Connecticut; this telescope is still the largest Maksutov in the U.S. In 1980, he donated an 8.2-inch f/16 Maksutov-Cassegrain that he had constructed to his alma mater, Case Western Reserve; he named it the "Nassau Memorial Telescope" after his former teacher there, astronomer J. J. Nassau.

At the 2006 Riverside Telescope Makers Conference, Gregory delivered the Robert Fulton Goff Invitational Lecture on Optics and Optical Design, entitled "My 60 Years of Astro-Optics".

== Personal life ==
John Gregory had two sons, Rick and Randy, with his first wife Barbara. He lost his second wife, Marion, to brain cancer, and was married in 1998 to Carolyn. He was an accomplished pianist, jewelry maker, and a pilot. He was a frequent attendee at meetings of amateur astronomers, including Stellafane and the Riverside Telescope Makers Conference. He was also active in politics, serving in several political action groups that lobbied for tort reform.

== Death ==
John Gregory died on November 14, 2009, following an automobile accident. The car his wife Carolyn was driving in Lakeway, Texas, was struck by a pickup truck around 8:20 am. He and Carolyn were flown to University Medical Center Brackenridge in Austin. John died later that day from injuries sustained in the accident, while Carolyn was critically injured and survived for three months before succumbing to her injuries. The alleged driver of the pickup truck was charged with criminally negligent homicide.
