= Vixen (telescopes) =

Japanese company

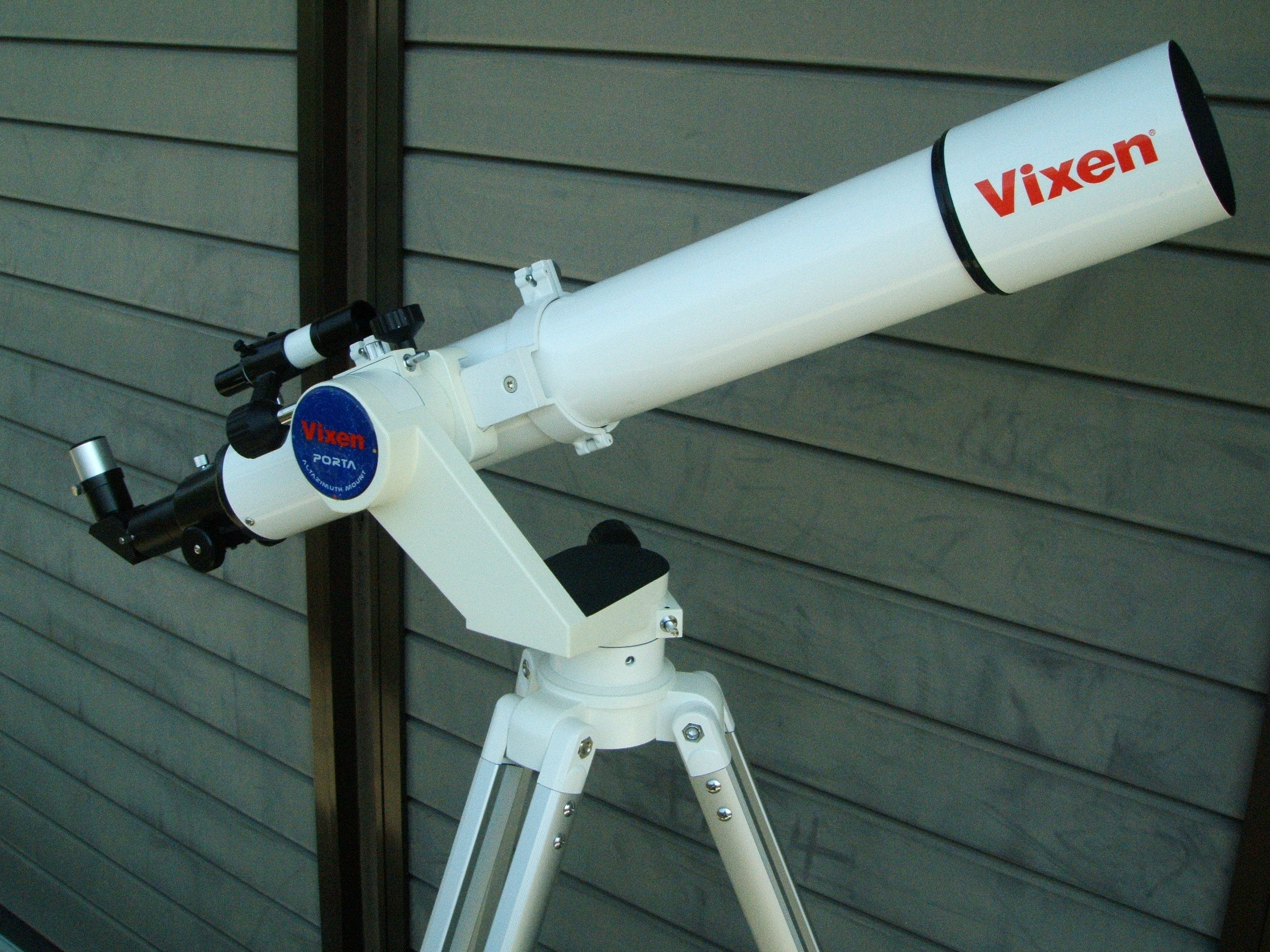
- Vixen refracting telescope
- Headquarters: Japan
- Website: vixen.co.jp

Vixen is a Japanese company that makes telescopes, binoculars, spotting scopes and accessories for their products.

Among many other more mainstream products they have created two unusual varieties of catadioptric telescopes with an open tube design instead of the full-aperture corrector plate of the Schmidt–Cassegrain and most Maksutov–Cassegrain designs.

== Klevtsov–Cassegrain ==
This design is based on the Maksutov–Cassegrain. It provides correction of aberrations via a two-element meniscus-shaped corrector lens in front of the secondary mirror. This design was originally envisaged by G. I. Popov with a practical implementation by Yu. A. Klevtsov. It is produced with apertures of 8, 10.25 and 13 inches. The 8-inch model employs a refractor style rack and pinion focuser, while in the larger designs the primary mirror is moved as in most other small to medium-sized Cassegrain designs.

== Vixen Sixth-Order Aspheric Cassegrain (VISAC) ==
Vixen produces an 8-inch aperture-modified Cassegrain design (VC200L) they refer to as a VISAC (Vixen Sixth-Order Aspheric Cassegrain) that is based on a Cassegrain design with a primary mirror that is "sixth order aspheric" – somewhat like a hyperbolic mirror but able to be manufactured using mass-production techniques. To compensate for the aberrations the mirror design introduces, Vixen adds a "field corrector lens" – actually a three-element corrector in the draw tube of the focuser which also reduces field curvature for wide field applications. The design results in an image that is free of coma and astigmatism. These characteristics have led to the VISAC being referred to as a "Poor man's Ritchey–Chrétien". In fact, given that it has no astigmatism and field curvature, it performs better than a true RC. There is the downside of the potential for chromatic aberration due to the refractive elements, but it is hardly noticeable.

This particular design is also unusual in that it is a Cassegrain design but has a fixed primary and refractor-style rack-and-pinion focuser which removes the image shift issues seen with other catadioptric designs.

These features together make for a telescope that is very well suited to astrophotography either at the native f/9 or using the optional focal reducer at around f/6.3.
