= Ondokuz Mayıs University =

Public university in Samsun, Turkey

Coordinates: 41°22′N 36°12′E

- Ondokuz Mayıs Üniversitesi
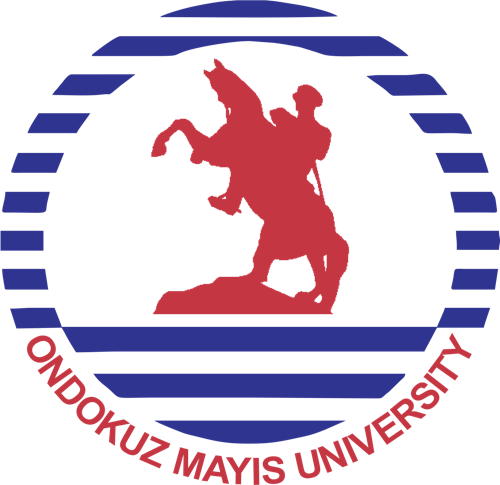
- Ondokuz Mayıs University Logo
- Type: Public University
- Established: April 1, 1975
- Affiliations: EUA
- Rector: Fatma Aydın
- Location: Samsun, Turkey
- Language: Turkish, English, French, German
- Website: omu.edu.tr

Ondokuz Mayıs University (OMU) is a major state university founded in 1975 in Samsun, Turkey. The university bears the name “19 May”, which marks the date when Mustafa Kemal Atatürk, founder of the Republic of Turkey, came to Samsun in order to start the War of Independence.
OMU consists of 16 Faculties, 1 Conservatoire (OMU Samsun State Conservatoire), 3 Schools (School of Civil Aviation, School of Foreign Languages, Samsun Health School), 11 Vocational Schools and 5 Institutes (Educational Sciences, Fine Arts, Health Sciences, Science and Technology, and Social Sciences). Its 2,175-acre main campus is centred on Atakum municipality in Samsun.
Based on University Ranking by Academic Performance (URAP) data, OMU ranks 14th among Turkish universities with medical schools.

== History ==
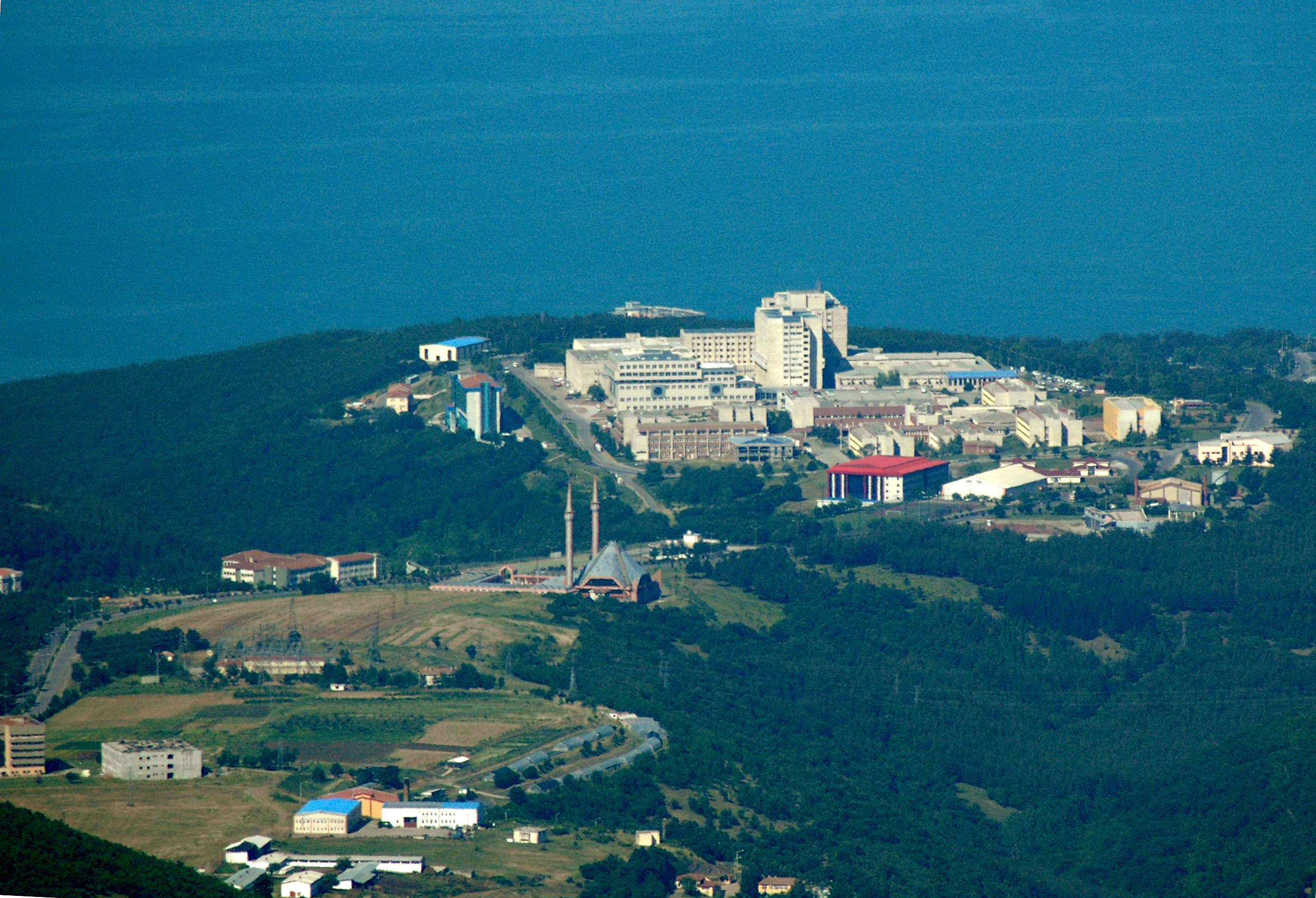
A view from OMU

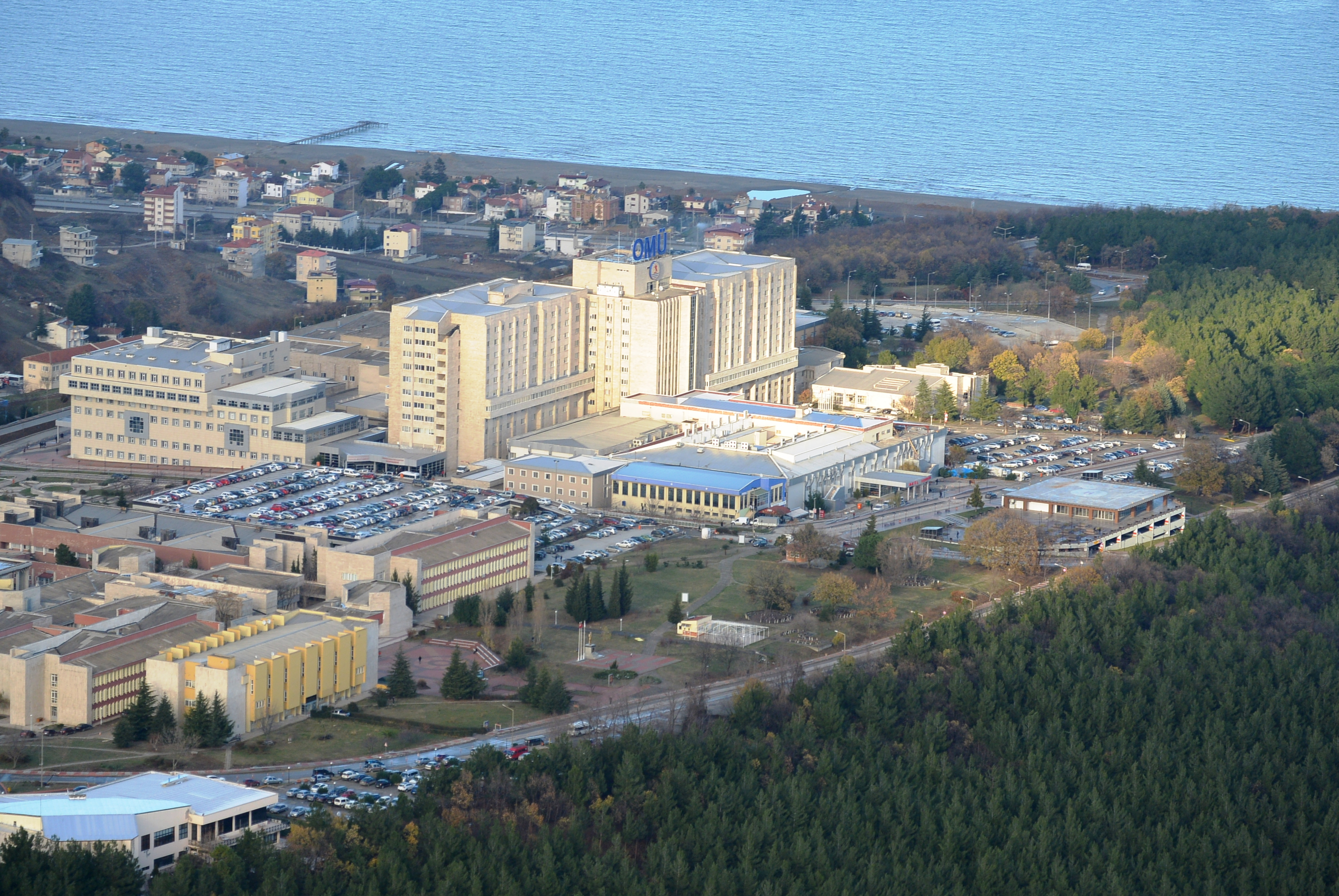
OMU Faculty of Medicine

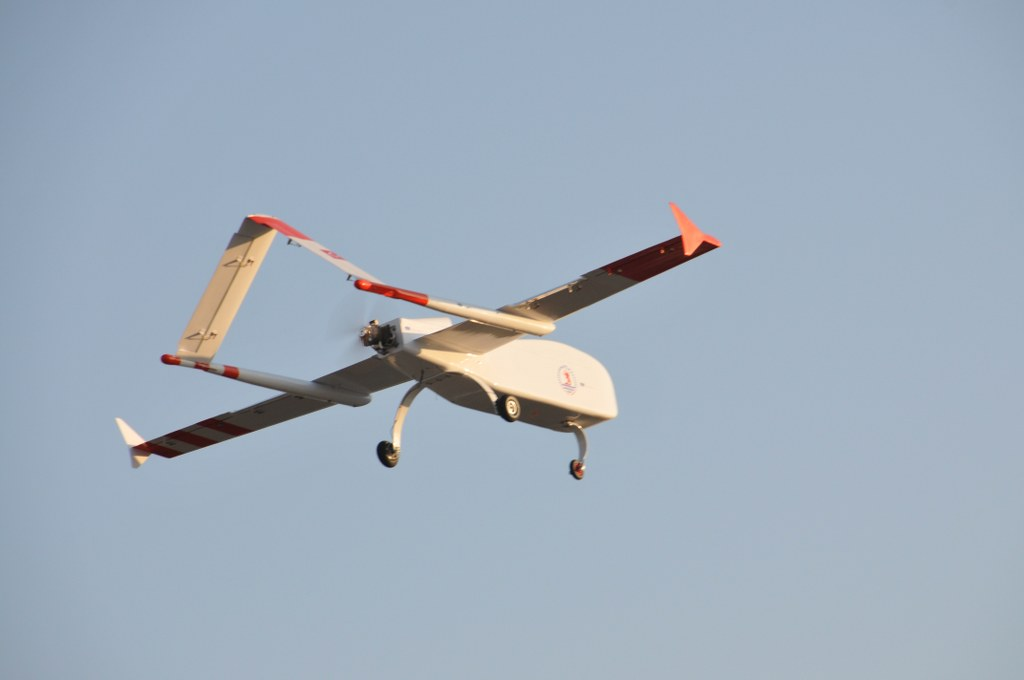
OMU Unmanned Aerial Vehicle

Ondokuz Mayıs University was founded on April 1, 1975, pursuant to the Law no. 1873 and its first classes were held in the same year with a total of 50 students. Samsun Faculty of Medicine, which was established in 1973 within the scope of Hacettepe University, was incorporated into newly founded Ondokuz Mayıs University in accordance with the Article 2 of the Law no.1873. As per the Article 3 of the above-mentioned Law, the Faculty of Natural Sciences and Engineering was established as the second faculty within the framework of Ondokuz Mayıs University. Faculty of Agriculture, the third faculty, was founded pursuant to the Decree no. 11.5/0 dated August 31, 1976 of the Board of Higher Education.
Certain higher education institutions affiliated to the Ministry of National Education were incorporated into Ondokuz Mayıs University in accordance with the Decree Law no. 41 regarding the Organization of Higher Education Institutions issued on July 20, 1982, pursuant to the provisional Article 28 of the Higher Education Law, and the afore-said institutions were reorganized.
OMU was reshaped in accordance with the subclauses (c), (d) and (e) of the Article 27 of the Law no. 2809 and Article 18 and Additional Article 29 of the Law no. 3837. As a result of this reorganization, Ondokuz Mayıs University consists of the Faculty of Medicine, Faculty of Science and Letters (previously named “Faculty of Natural Sciences and Engineering”), Faculty of Education, Faculty of Theology, Faculty of Dentistry, Ondokuz Mayıs Samsun State Conservatory, Graduate School of Social Sciences, Graduate School of Natural and Applied Sciences, Graduate School of Health Sciences, Graduate School of Fine Arts, Vocational School of Health Services established by the Board of Higher Education in 1988 in the city center, Vocational Schools founded in Samsun and Bafra in 1992, in Havza in 1993, Vezirköprü in 1994, in Kavak in 1995, Faculty of Engineering founded in 1992 in accordance with law no. 3837, Faculty of Veterinary Medicine and Faculty of Economics and Administrative Sciences established in accordance with the decree no. 95/7515 of the Council of Ministers, Samsun Vocational School of Health founded in 1997 in accordance with the decree no. 96/8655 of the Council of Ministers, Yaşar Doğu Vocational School of Sports Sciences established in accordance with the decree no. 97/9414 of the Council of Ministers, Terme Vocational School founded in 1999 by the Board of Higher Education, Çarşamba Vocational School founded in 2000 by the Board of Higher Education, and the Faculty of Law established in December, 2008 pursuant to the decree no. 2008/14492 of the Council of Ministers.
Certain units separated from Ondokuz Mayıs University formed the basis for 3 universities in 3 cities: Amasya Faculty of Education, Amasya Faculty of Science and Letters, Faculty of Professional and Technical Education and Faculty of Architecture, Amasya Vocational School of Health, and Amasya and Merzifon Vocational Schools were incorporated into Amasya University which was founded pursuant to the law no. 4567 issued in the Official Gazette no. 26111 dated March 17, 2006. Ordu Faculty of Science and Letters, Ünye Faculty of Economics and Administrative Sciences and Fatsa Faculty of Marine Sciences, Ordu Vocational School of Health, and Mesudiye, Ünye and Fatsa Vocational Schools were incorporated into Ordu University which was founded pursuant to the law no. 4567 issued in the Official Gazette no. 26111 dated March 17, 2006. Sinop Faculty of Aquaculture, Sinop Faculty of Science and Letters, Boyabat Faculty of Economics and Administrative Sciences, Sinop Vocational School of Health, Sinop, Boyabat, Gerze and Ayancık Vocational Schools were incorporated into Sinop University which was founded pursuant to the law no. 5662 issued in the Official Gazette no. 26536 dated May 29, 2007.

== Administration and organization ==
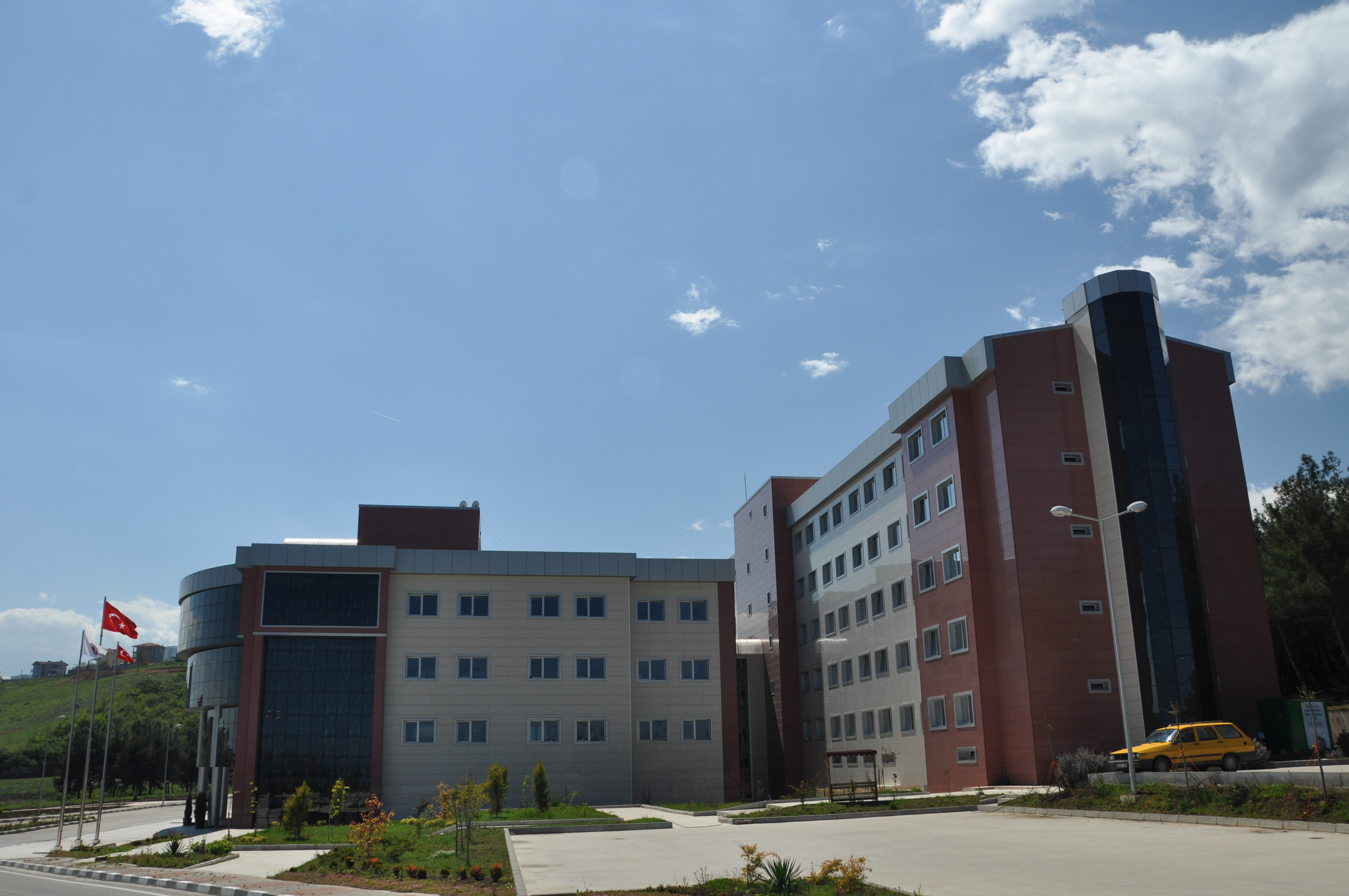
Rectorate

The Rector is the formal head of the university. He is appointed for a period of four years by the President of Turkey from the candidates elected by the university academic staff proposed by the Higher Education Board. He is the Chairperson of the University Administrative Board and Senate. He implements the resolutions of the governing bodies of the higher education, reviews and decides on the proposals of the university board and ensures coordination among organizations attached to the university.
Four Vice Rectors are appointed by the University Rector chosen from professors employed in the university to assist the rector during the rector's term of office.
The University Rector may also appoint advisors to the Rector.
The University Senate comprises the Rector as chairperson, the Vice Rectors, the Deans, a representative from each Faculty and the Directors of the Graduate Schools and Schools directly attached to the Rectorate. It is the chief academic body of the university. It is responsible for research, pedagogical and study matters which affect Ondokuz Mayıs University or any central institute.
The University Administrative Board consists of the Rector as the chairperson, the Deans and three Professors selected by the University Senate for a period of four years.

== Campus ==
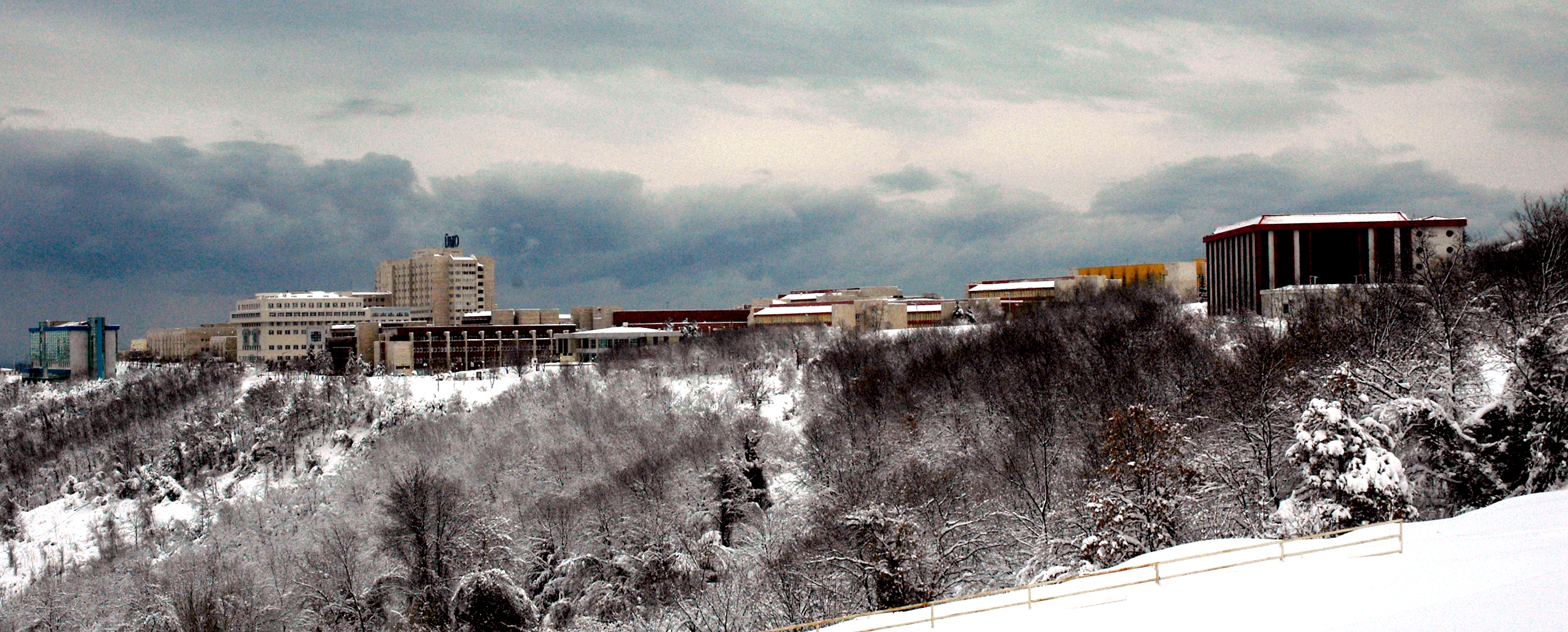
A view from campus

OMU's main campus in Atakum covers 10,000 acres with a view of the Black Sea on the one side and a view of the nationally famous Kocadag Mountain on the other side, which is well known for its national yearly walks.
The following faculties and facilities are located in the main campus: Faculty of Medicine, Faculty of Dentistry, Faculty of Engineering, Faculty of Arts and Sciences, Faculty of Agriculture, Faculty of Education, Faculty of Divinity, Faculty of Economics and Administrative Sciences, Faculty of Veterinary Medicine, School of Foreign Languages, Rectorial Office, Main Library and IT Centre, Vocational School of Basic Sciences, Auditorium, Children's Hospital, Staff Residences, UZEM (Distance Learning Center), Yaşardoğu Faculty of Sport, Planetarium, Observatory, Student Dormitories, OMU Mosque, Surgical Research Clinic, Atatürk Congress and Culture Centre, Children Education Centre, Continuous Education Centre, Guesthouse, International Relations Office, Veterinary Hospital.
The university's first and largest faculty, the Faculty of Medicine, is also a university hospital. Similarly, the Faculty of Dentistry is a Dental Hospital. Serving the inhabitants of the entire Black Sea region, both faculties provide treatment in all areas of health and dental care.

== Academics ==
As of 2013-2014 Academic Year, OMU has a total of 28,418 undergraduate, 4659 graduate, and 10.850 associate degree students.

== Admissions ==
=== Turkish Students ===
The registration, examinations and evaluation procedures in Ondokuz Mayıs University are carried out according to Higher Education Law and Regulations put by Higher Education Council (YÖK).
In order to gain admission to an associate (2-year, short cycle) or undergraduate program (4-year, first cycle) in a higher education institution in Turkey, students have to take a university entrance exam administered by Student Selection and Placement Center (ÖSYM). The examination consists of two stages. First stage is the Higher Education Entrance Exam (YGS). Students need to get 140 over 500 to enter the second exam called Bachelor Placement Exam (LYS). The second stage exam, LYS, is applied as 5 separate sessions. Students attend related session according to their study field such as Mathematics, Science etc. Students who get 180 over 500 can make their choices of Bachelor program and the institution. The placement into most of the first cycle degree programs is made by ÖSYM based on the scores students obtained from the exam and their grade point averages (GPA) of secondary education (high school in Turkish Education System).
The placement of the students who want to study in an associate programme is based on the scores from YGS. An exception, however, is recognized, by law, for vocational high school graduates to apply for placement in two-year vocational school programs which are compatible with their high school majors, without an entrance examination. These students are placed centrally by ÖSYM according to the type of vocational high schools they graduated and their grade point averages (GPA).
Students willing to enrol in School of Physical Education and Sports, Faculty of Education Department of Fine Arts Education (Music Education and Arts Education) have to take aptitude test as defined by the university's Senate with the related Boards' opinions. For such programs, the YGS is also a prerequisite for placement. The final list of students is decided by adding up a pre-determined percentage of the YGS score and the local exam (aptitude test).
The Registrar's Office coordinate and carries out registration procedures. Students who meet the above-mentioned conditions should finalize the registration procedure personally, on the Academic Calendar of the related year.
To study in the graduate programs, the students are required to take an exam called “ALES” (Academic Personnel and Graduate Education Exam), which is also administered by ÖSYM, and submit this score with their application. GRE or GMAT can also be a substitute of ALES. The applicants have to meet additional program requirements defined by the academic units.

=== International students for full degree ===
Recently, the universities have the right for selection of foreign students in accordance with their own regulations. The admission criteria have to be approved by Higher Education Council of Turkey (YÖK). OMU organizes an annual examination called Ondokuz Mayıs University International Students Entrance Examination (OMU-ISE). The examination is only for those applicants to enrol in undergraduate (first cycle) programmes. The first condition for those wishing to take OMU-ISE is having another nationality other than Turkey (stateless persons and refugees can also apply). Secondly, they must be in the last year of secondary education or have successfully completed secondary education. In addition to OMU-ISE organized each year, the students are accepted to the undergraduate programmes according to the score of one of the international exams determined by the Senate.

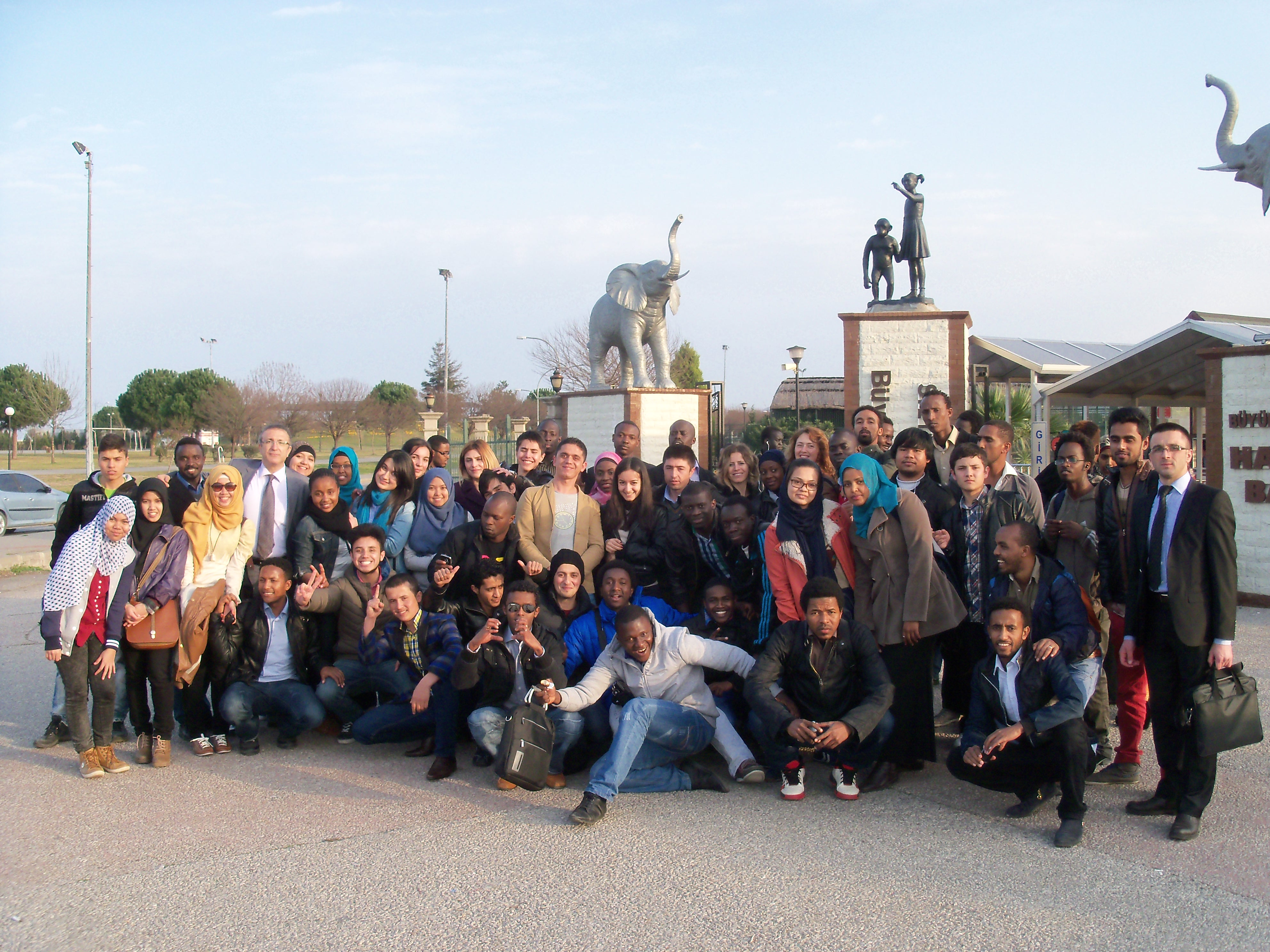
International students

The international candidates may apply to graduate studies at master or doctorate levels. Applications to graduate programs are processed by Graduate Schools. There are minimum requirements for application to different departments.

=== Exchange students ===
OMU actively uses the Erasmus+, Mevlana, and Farabi (a national programme where students can exchange between Turkish universities) exchange programmes.
Exchange students are accepted to OMU within the framework of the current agreements between OMU and applicant students' university. The exchange students can enrol in the courses offered at OMU and study for either one semester, or for the whole academic year.
Application procedures for exchange students are administered by the OMU International Relations Office. Detailed information such as related year's deadlines, update news and contact persons can be found here.

== Internationalization ==
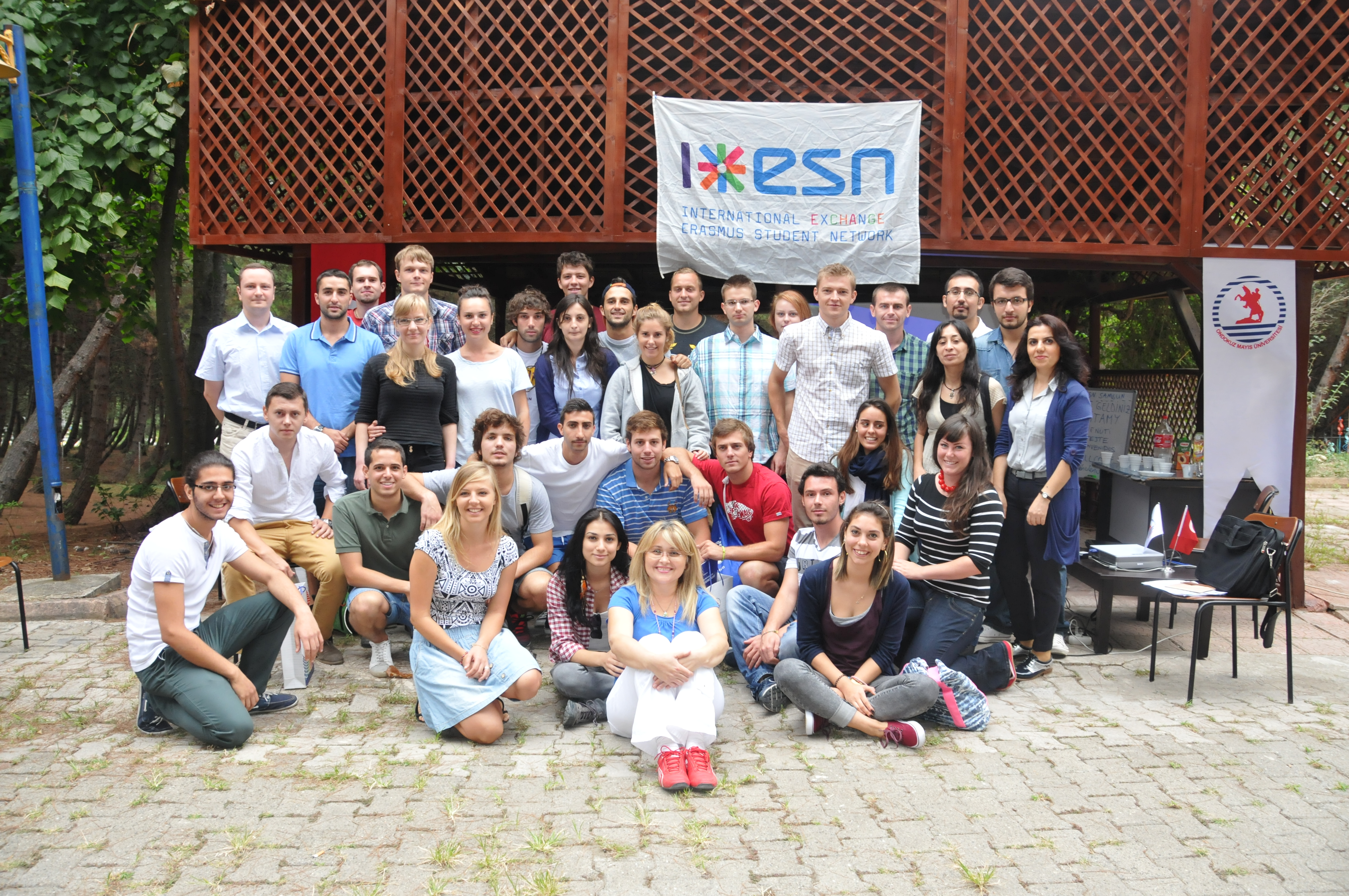
International office

OMU puts emphasis on internationalization process and provision of necessary information, technology, communication and human resources against increasing competition in education in order to make progress in rapidly globalizing world and to be recognized in international platforms. For this purpose, internationalization is one of the main objectives of OMU; enhancement of the quality of education and researches is also of the utmost importance for international employability of graduates. OMU aims to create a campus area in which international interaction and communication are at top level, and to encourage the students and staff to experience international cultures and educational environments.
Bologna Process has acted as an accelerator for establishing an understanding of quality assurance and sustainable development. The Bologna Process aims to create a consistent and competitive “European Higher Education Area” based on mutual understanding and complementarity among European countries. This process, which is rapidly growing and which has a dynamic nature, is not an adaptation of a new system; in fact, it is a movement of “innovation in education” that unifies existing systems.
Within the framework of Bologna Process, OMU makes continuous effort on developing the academic programs in order to enhance the quality of education and research, and to increase the quantity and quality of the international mobility. Every year, increasing number of incoming and outgoing students benefits from mobility programs like Erasmus+ and Mevlana and mutual cooperation agreements.
In addition to the mobility programs, academic cooperation protocols also open the way for developing international cooperation. OMU has 125 Erasmus Agreements with 23 European countries, 56 Mevlana protocols and 48 mutual cooperation agreements signed between OMU and international universities.
The number of international degree students studying at OMU is increasing every year as an indicator of OMU's objective for creating an international campus. Today, OMU is one of the leading universities in Turkey with approximately 1750 foreign students from 80 countries.
OMU started to hold the International Student Entrance Examination (OMU-ISE) as of 2011–2012 academic year, which is the first of its kind in Turkey. The main objective of the examination is to provide a standard for the application criteria and to facilitate the application process. For increasing the accessibility of the examination, OMU-ISE was held in 33 centers for 2014–2015 academic year, and approximately 4250 students sat for the examination. OMU-ISE is accepted as an admission criterion for international students by 97 Universities (67 State and 30 Foundation) in Turkey.

== Notable alumni ==
- Çiğdem Belci
- Selçuk Çebi
- Meryem Özyumşak
- Mesme Taşbağ
- Asli Tarcan
- Şeref Tüfenk
- Sibel Yiğitalp
