= Meade ETX telescope =

Line of Maksutov-Cassegrain telescopes

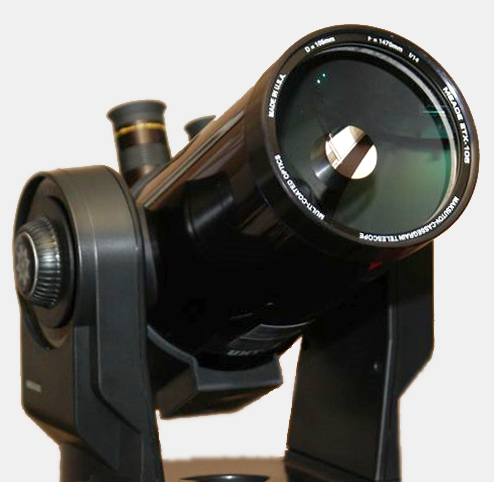
- A 105mm diameter Meade ETX
- Website: www.meade.com/products/telescopes/etx.html

The ETX ("Everybody's Telescope") is a line of smaller aperture telescopes (60mm to 127mm) made by Meade Instruments.

== Origins ==
The ETX started out as a 90 mm (3-1/2") Maksutov Cassegrain telescope (first produced in 1996) and took advantage of high volume mass production and simplified optical and parts construction to open a new market for a cheap alternative to the very expensive Questar 3-1/2" Maksutov Cassegrain The ETX "line" has been expanded to 105 mm, and 127 mm Maksutov Cassegrains and achromatic refracting telescopes in sizes of 60 mm and 70 mm, with the lattermost two models eventually being replaced by an 80 mm model. The line has come to take advantage of "goto" telescope mount technology, making it very popular with amateur astronomers.

== Model variations ==
=== Maksutov-Cassegrain ===
The original 1996 model, now referred to as the "RA" or "classic" model, had a clockwork mechanism to track movement of the earth with an equatorial wedge, but it cannot be retrofitted for computer control. Also included were tabletop tripod legs similar to the Questar.

In January 1999, Meade introduced the ETX-EC which included electronic control of both axis through a small hand-controller. An optional #497 Autostar package was offered and would replace the simple electric controls, turning the ETX-EC into a fully computerized "goto" telescope. A "standard" #883 tripod was available as an optional accessory.

Not officially a new model but rather a package (which eventually became standard), the "AT" package included an ETX-EC telescope bundled with the #497 Autostar controller and a stronger "deluxe" #884 tripod.

Meade's UHTC (Ultra High Transmission Coating) treatment was first offered as an option on "EC" model telescopes (part of the "AT" bundle) in 2002. This coating improves light transmission by about 15%.

In October 2004, Meade announced the new ETX-PE or Premier Edition. The small right-angle finder scope was replaced on these models by a LNT (Level North Technology) module which included a level sensor, a magnetic north sensor, accelerometer, real-time clock and a frameless red-dot viewfinder. UHTC was still offered as an option. Also bundled was the PC interface cable. These Premier Edition telescopes had an image of the North American (ETX-125) or Orion (ETX-90) Nebulae printed on the optical tube. These scopes were assembled in Meade's new facility located in Mexico.

Final versions of the ETX-PE (after January 2007) used a revised (framed viewfinder) LNT module and Autostar controller (#497EP), made the UHTC coatings standard and went back to blue optical tubes. The mounting points for the tabletop tripod were deleted as well. Production of these final versions was in China.

Retail price of the ETX telescope has been constantly going down since its original 1996 introduction while capabilities and included accessories have increased dramatically.

Production of the ETX-105 ended in November 2009 and the ETX-125 followed suit in October 2011.

The ETX-90 and ETX-125 Observer telescopes returned with many upgrades in 2016, continuing the legacy of the ETX series.

=== Achromatic Refractors ===
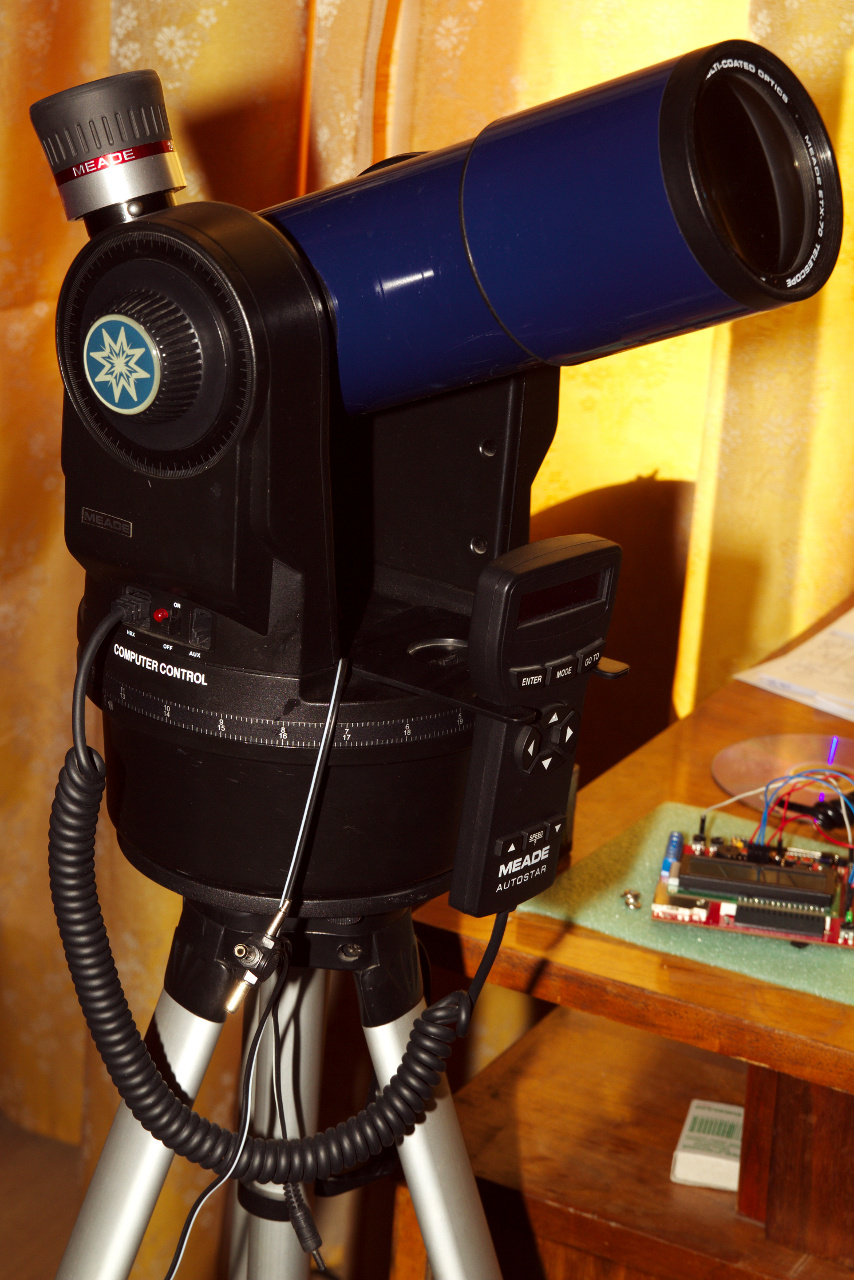
Meade ETX-70AT, 70/350mm achromatic refractor.

In 2000, Meade added small 60 mm and 70 mm achromatic refractors to its ETX line. They were mounted on a dual fork mount similar to the larger models and included computer controls in the form of the #494 autostar.

At the time of introduction, they were some of the least expensive "goto" telescopes on the market.

Both models were replaced later by a single 80mm F/5 model.

=== Schmidt-Cassegrain ===
In 2009, Meade introduced the ETX-LS, a 152 mm (6 in) F/10 Schmidt-Cassegrain or ACF telescope on a very different single-fork arm. The LS include the Autostar III controller with over 100,000 objects in its database. It has a built-in CCD imager (E.C.L.P.S.) and a mini SD card reader for astrophotography. It includes audio and video descriptions of several hundred targets

An 8" version of the LS scope is also available, also F/10
