= Meade Instruments =

Manufacturer of telescopes, etc., based in Watsonville, California

Meade Acquisition Corp dba Meade Instruments
- Type: Private
- Industry: Manufacturing
- Founded: 1972; 54 years ago
- Headquarters: Watsonville, California, United States
- Key people: Peter Moreo, President; Deborah Woodward "VP Ops"
- Products: Optical and electromechanical instruments
- Owner: Optronic Holding Corp
- Website: https://web.archive.org/web/20241120012017/http://meade.com/

Meade Instruments Corporation (also shortened to Meade) was an American multinational company headquartered in Watsonville, California, that manufactured, imported and distributed telescopes, binoculars, spotting scopes, microscopes, CCD cameras, and telescope accessories for the consumer market. It was, at one point, the world's largest manufacturer of telescopes.

Besides selling under its "Meade" brand name, the company sold solar telescopes under the brand "Coronado".

In July 2024, Sky and Telescope magazine reported that Optronic Technologies, the owner of Meade Instruments and Orion Telescopes, had closed their facilities in California and had laid off all of their employees. As of July 15, there had been no official announcement from the company, and S&T said they were trying to get more information from their sources. As of December, 2024, the Sky & Telescope website announced that the assets of Meade, Coronado and Orion Telescopes and Binoculars would be listed for auction and that these companies were ceasing operations.

== Origins and history ==
Founded in 1972 by John Diebel, Meade started as a mail order seller of small refracting telescopes and telescope accessories manufactured by the Japan-based Towa Optical Manufacturing Company. Meade started manufacturing its own line of products in 1976, introducing 6" and 8" reflecting telescopes models in 1977. In 1980, the company ventured into the Schmidt-Cassegrain market that up to that time had been dominated by Celestron Corporation. Meade has a long history of litigation with other companies over infringement of their patents, particularly with its once bitter rival Celestron. In August 2008, Meade modified their line of Schmidt-Cassegrain telescopes with changes to the optical surfaces in design they call "Advanced Coma-Free optics" (ACF Optics).

Past production sites include 16542 Millikan Avenue in Irvine, which was used in the 1990s. Meade production was consequently moved to a new build plant in 6001 Oak Canyon, located as well in Irvine. The Oak Canyon plant was in use for about a decade until 2009, after which production was moved to an expanded plant in Tijuana, Mexico.

In October 2013, Meade Instruments merged with Ningbo Sunny Electronic, a Chinese manufacturer, and Joseph Lupica became CEO of Meade. In February 2015, Victor Aniceto succeeded Lupica as president.

On November 26, 2019, in the United States District Court for the Northern District of California a federal jury found that Ningbo and Meade suppressed competition and fixed prices for consumer telescopes in the United States in violation of federal antitrust laws (case# 16-06370). Optronic Technologies, Inc. was awarded $16.8 million in damages.

On December 4, 2019, Meade Instruments Corp. filed bankruptcy in the United States District Court for the Central District of California as case number 19-14714.

== Products ==
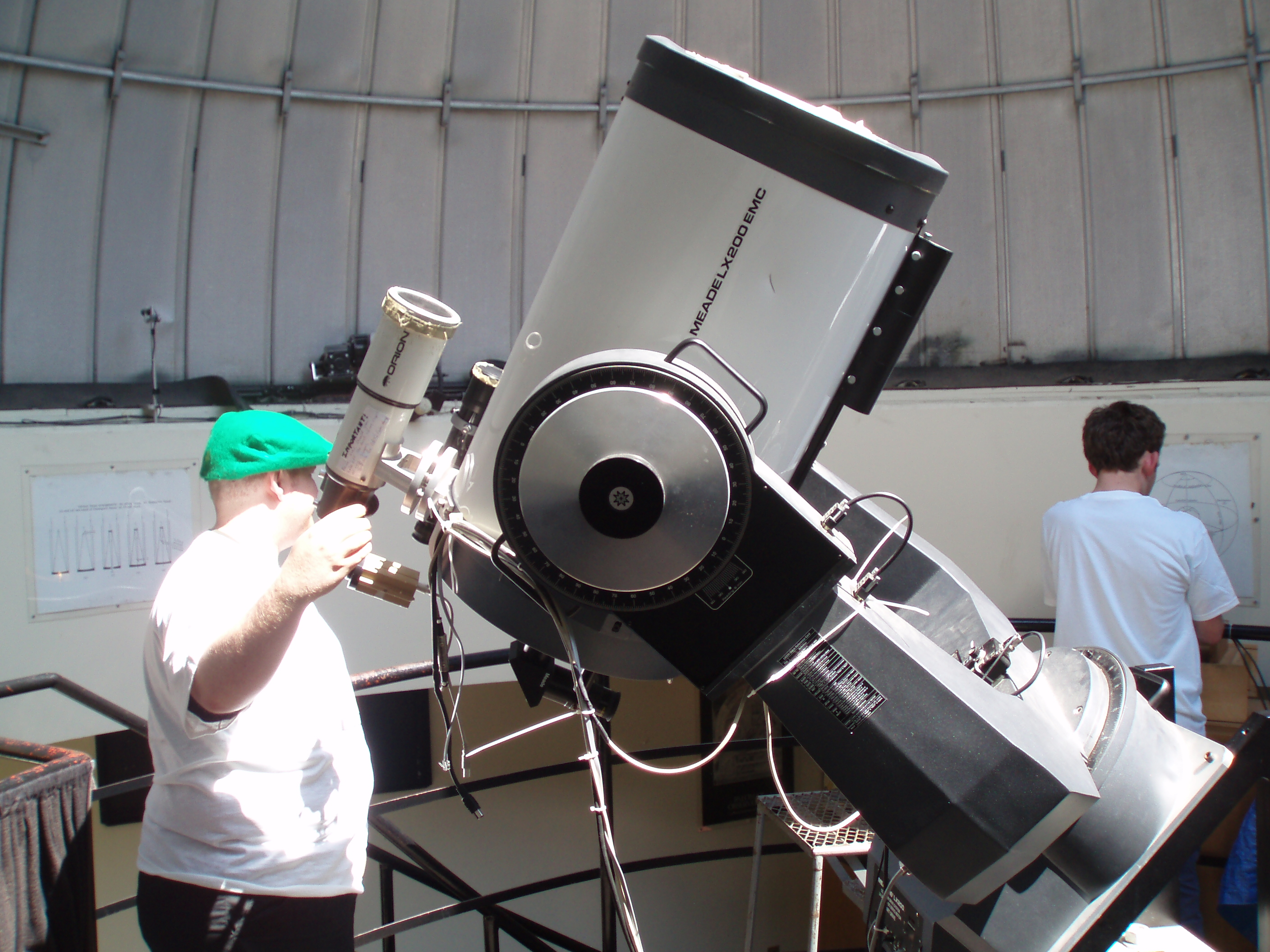
A 16" (40.64 cm) Meade LX200 in the York University Observatory

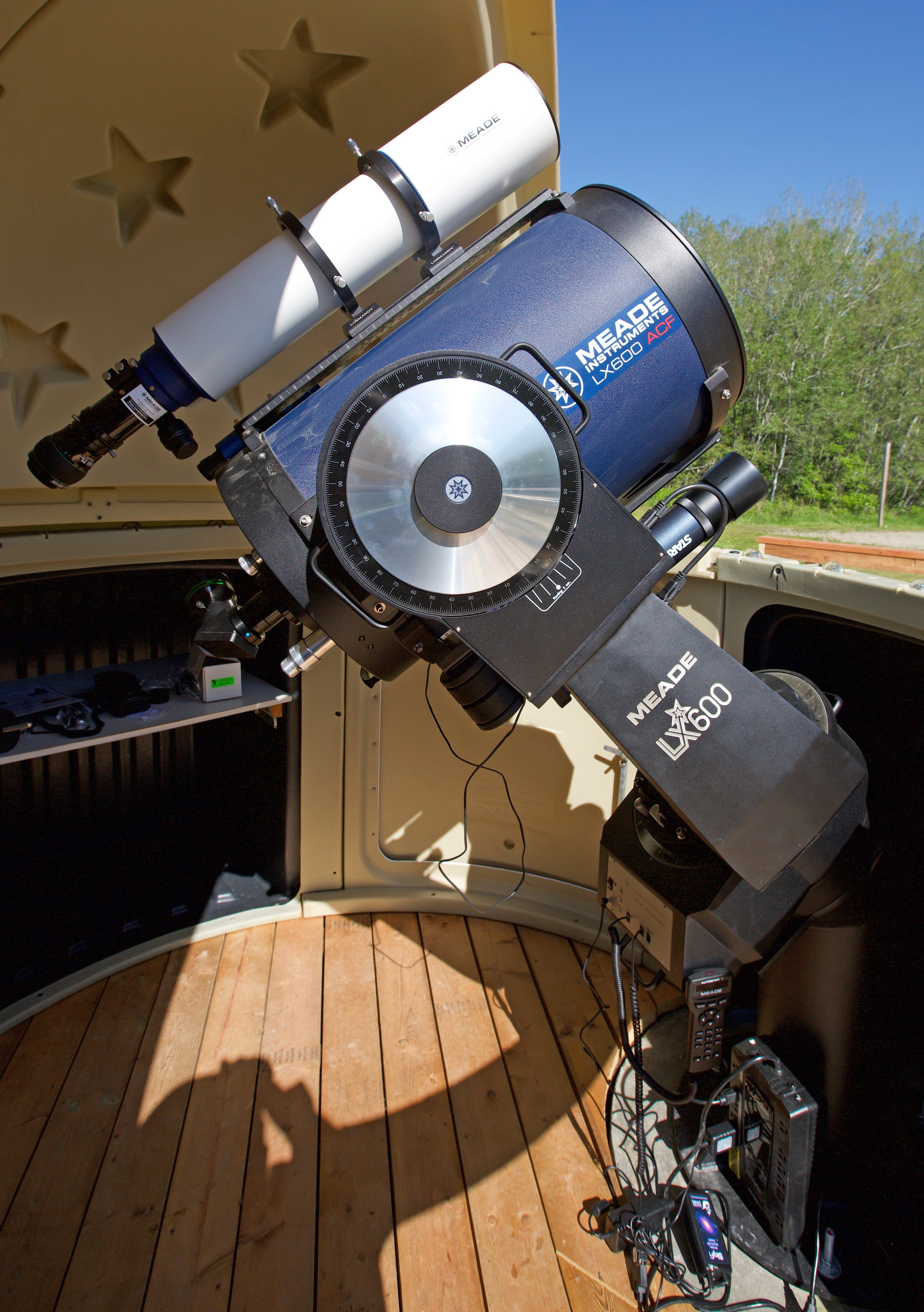
Meade LX600-ACF 16" f/8 at Killarney Provincial Park Observatory

Products produced by Meade include:

=== Catadioptric cassegrains ===
==== ACF telescopes ====
ACF (Advanced Coma-Free) is an altered version of the Meade's previous schmidt-cassegrain telescopes that replaces the traditional spherical schmidt-cassegrain secondary mirror with a hyperbolic secondary mirror. In the new design the full aperture corrector is slightly altered in shape and combined with a spherical primary mirror. Meade's literature describes their ACF as a variation on the Ritchey-Chrétien telescope, although it does not use the two hyperbolic mirror combination in that design (being more of an aplantic design).

Models

- LX90-ACF, 8" to 12"
- LX200-ACF, a series of LX200 with ACF Optics 8" to 16"
- LX400-ACF, 16 to 20" f/8, w/ robotic equatorial mount
- LX800

==== Maksutov telescopes ====
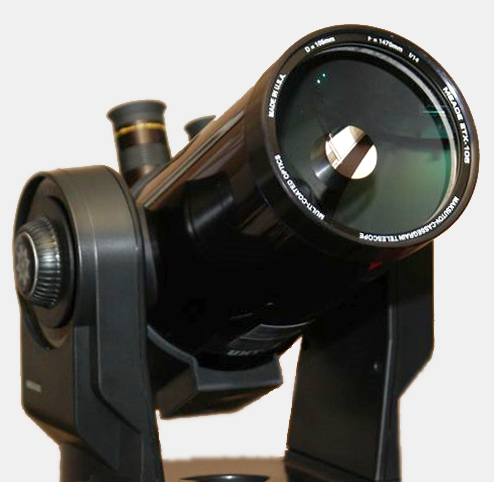
The Meade "ETX" series Maksutov-Cassegrain telescope (105mm aperture).

Meade produces a line of Maksutov telescopes under their ETX series (Everybody's Telescope). They were first produced at an aperture of 90 mm (3-1/2") in 1996, in the form of the ETX-90. Since then, the lineup has expanded to include 105 mm (ETX-105) and 127 mm (ETX-125) options.

=== Newtonian telescopes ===
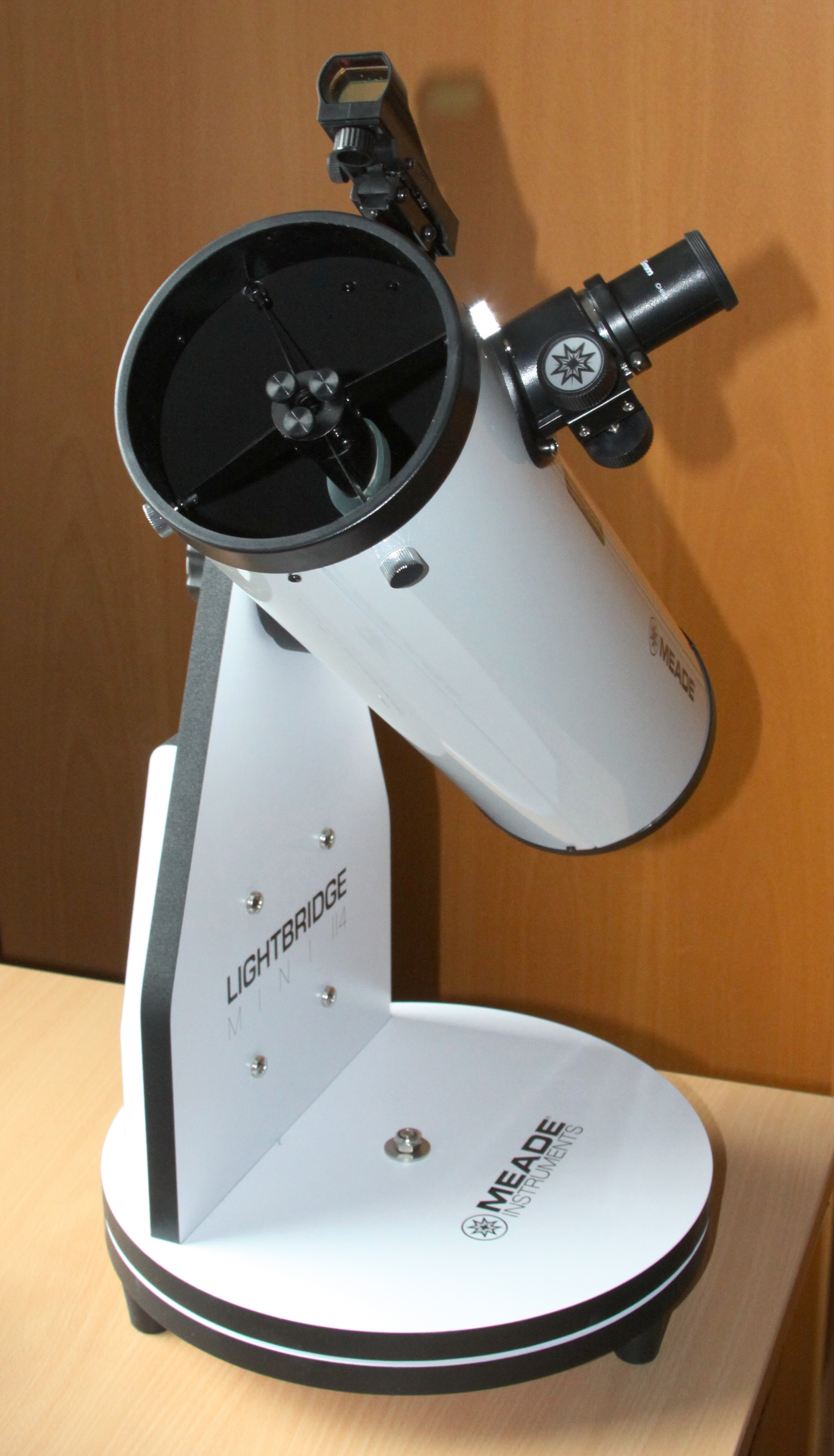
4.5-inch (110 mm) LightBridge Mini 114 Dobsonian

- Schmidt-Newtonian telescopes (6 to 10 inches).
- LightBridge Dobsonian telescopes (currently 8, 10, 12 and a 16-inch model)
- Meade Model 4504: 4.5-inch (110 mm) equatorial reflecting telescope

=== GoTo telescopes ===
Many Meade telescope lines are classified by the self aiming computerized alt-azimuth and equatorial mounts they come on, a technology commonly called a "GoTo" mount.

Models

- LXD75, including Newtonian, Schmidt-Newtonian, Advanced Coma-Free, and achromatic refractor telescopes
- ETX-LS, 150mm (6 in) and 200mm (8 in) F/10 ACF telescope on a single-fork arm with integral GPS and 'Eclips' camera for self-alignment.
- DS-2000 Series, 80mm (3.1") refractor, 114mm (4.5") and 130mm (5.1") reflector on altazimuth Goto mounts
- LX80, LX90
- ETX-70, ETX-80
- LX85, including Newtonian, Schmidt-Newtonian, Advanced Coma-Free, and achromatic refractor telescopes

=== Solar telescopes ===
In 2004, Meade acquired Coronado Filters from founder and designer David Lunt, who produce an extensive range of specialty telescopes that allow views of the sun in Hydrogen-Alpha, and formerly, at Calcium K line wavelengths. The Meade Coronado telescopes are called "Solarmax 40" or higher depending on the model.

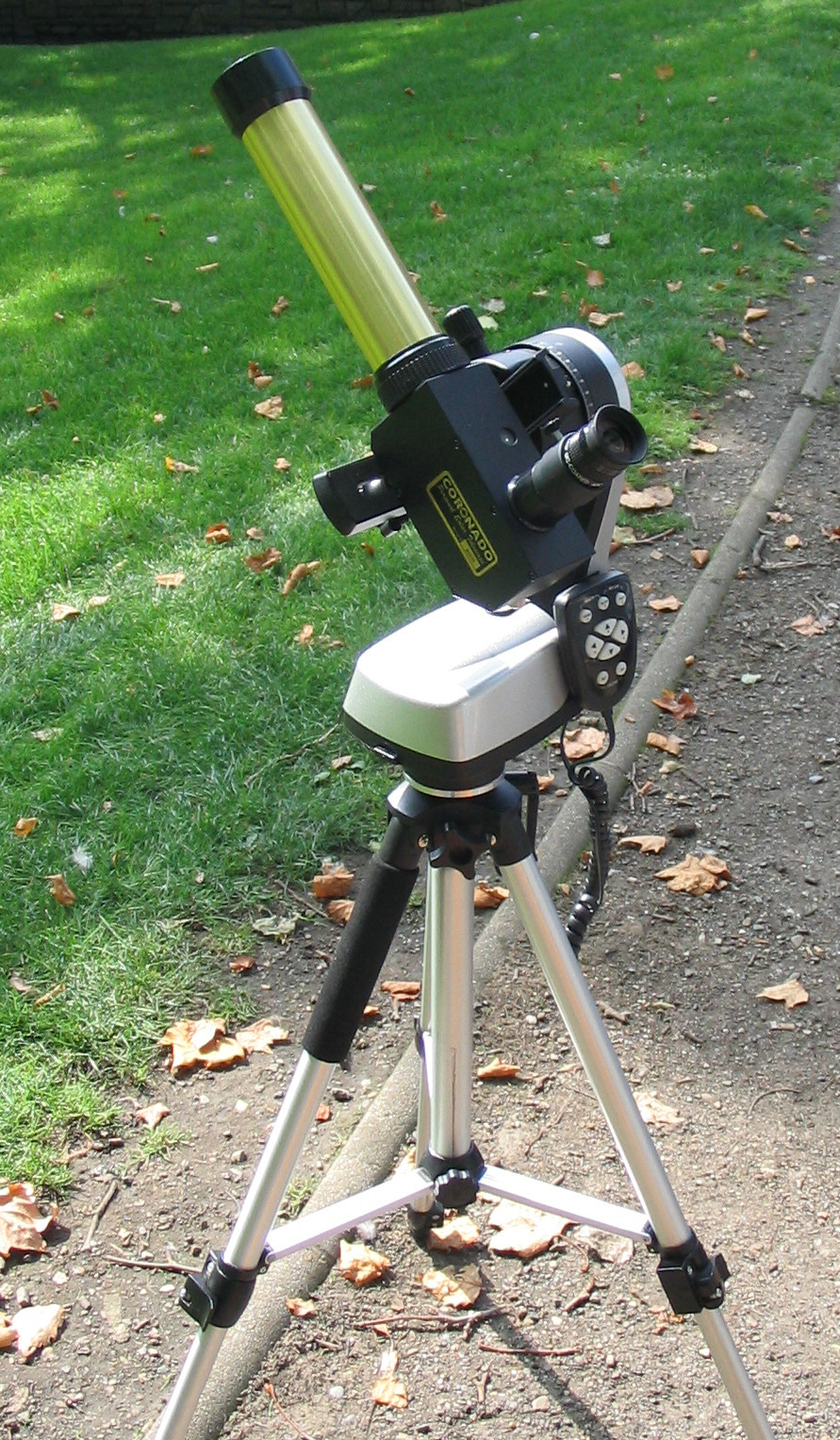
Coronado Personal Solar Telescope

=== Other products ===
- Achromatic refractors (5 and 6-inch)
- Meade also sells under the "Meade" name imported low to moderate cost reflectors and refractors intended for the beginner retail market.

=== Telescope accessories ===
Accessories produced by Meade include the series 5000 eyepieces that are comparable in construction to those of Chester, New York-based Tele Vue Optical's "Nagler" (82-degree field of view), "Panoptic" (68-degree field of view), and "Radian" (60-degree field of view) eyepieces. Meade sells Deep Sky and Lunar digital imagers for telescopes. They also market the mySKY & mySKY Plus, multi-media GPS devices guiding users to the sky, similar to the competing Celestron SkyScout.

== Litigation ==
In November, 2006, plaintiffs including Star Instruments and RC Optical Systems, manufacturers of traditional Ritchey-Chrétien optics and telescopes, filed a civil lawsuit against Meade, several dealerships, and other individuals in federal court (New York Southern District). The complaint was against Meade advertising their RCX400 and LX200R models as "Ritchey-Chrétien." The plaintiffs claimed these models did not use true Ritchey-Chrétien optics and therefore Meade and its retailers were committing false advertising infringing on the plaintiff's market. In January 2008, Meade settled, with a "small" amount paid to the plaintiffs and the requirement to rename the affected products, not using any initials that might suggest Ritchey-Chrétien.

On September 27, 2006, Finkelstein, Thompson & Loughran filed a class action lawsuit against Meade. The complaint alleged that, throughout the Class Period, defendants misrepresented and omitted material facts concerning Meade's backdating of stock option grants to two of its officers. A settlement of $2,950,000 was reached in December, 2007.

== Financial problems ==
Meade had financial problems in the past and had survived with the help of its founder, John Diebel, purchasing back the company. However, Meade in the past few years had run into another round of financial woes, since Diebel sold the company again. The previous CEO since May 2006, Steve Muellner had announced various bad news for the company since he had the lead role for Meade. Meade's Irvine, California manufacturing plant was closed, with manufacturing moved to a new plant in Mexico, and a majority of the administrative positions were cut. Meade's customer service line has also been affected by the move to Mexico, including shorter operating hours and the elimination of the callback option. Meade was also looking at other options for the uncertain future of the company. No matter what the future held for the company, Muellner and some of the board members signed an agreement to cover themselves financially.

In April 2008, Meade sold two of its three non-telescope product brands (Weaver/Redfield) to two companies for a total of $8 million. However, as compensation for divestiture of these two brands, out-going VP of Sales, Robert Davis, received a $100,000 bonus from the company. On June 13, 2008, Meade sold their last non-telescope brand Simmons to Bushnell for $7.25 million. Also in 2008, Meade's stock value fell below one dollar, bringing up the possibility of Meade being delisted from the stock exchange. On October 3, 2008, Meade eliminated Donald Finkle's Senior Vice President position with the company providing him with one year of salary as severance and certain other benefits.

Meade announced on January 29, 2009 that it had sold Meade Europe, its European subsidiary, for 12.4 million dollars, thus relieving much of Meade's debt. However, that reduced the company's assets greatly. Further changes and unknown stability of the company was announced on February 5, 2009, with the resignation of Steve Muellner, chairman of the board Harry Casari and fellow board member James Chadwick. Former CEO Steven Murdock was reinstated as Meade CEO. On March 5, 2009, the company announced the resignation of CFO Paul Ross and the assumption of the position by John Elwood. With his resignation, Ross receives a severance in the lump sum of $260,000. During the summer of 2009, Meade announced a 20:1 reverse stock split in hopes of raising the value of their stock.

By July 8, 2013, Meade Instruments faced a crucial decision on whether to sell the company to a Chinese company or a San Jose venture capital firm, plow ahead alone, or possibly seek bankruptcy protection. In September 2013, Sunny Optics Inc, a unit of the Chinese firm Ningbo Sunny Electronic Co Ltd, completed the acquisition of the entire share capital of Meade.

In November 2019, Orion Telescopes & Binoculars won a lawsuit against Ningbo Sunny Electronic Co Ltd for price fixing and anti-competitive practices costing Sunny Ningbo an estimated 20 million dollars in settlement. Meade under Ningbo Sunny ownership shortly after declared bankruptcy. On June 1, 2021, Orion Telescopes & Binoculars announced the acquisition rescue of Meade Instruments, following the approval of the United States Bankruptcy Court for the Central District of California.
