= Wright camera =

Astrophotography camera design

In astrophotography, the Wright camera design, presented by Franklin Wright (Berkeley, California) in 1935, just a few years after the introduction of the Schmidt camera, was his "short" alternative to the original arrangement.

Wright placed the Schmidt corrector at the focal plane, and had the mirror aspherised to cancel coma resulting from the altered aperture stop position (the aperture stop effectively coinciding with the corrector).

== Image quality ==
While astigmatism remains present in the Wright camera, it combines with the mirror's Petzval field curvature to result in a flat best image surface. In effect, the only monochromatic fourth order (wavefront) aberration of the Wright camera is relatively strong astigmatism.

In terms of the wavefront error, the flat-field P–V errors are identical in both, Schmidt and Wright camera, given by W=h^{2}/16DF^{3} (h being the height in the image plane, D the aperture diameter and F the focal ratio number).

However, while the off-axis error in the flat-field Schmidt results from defocus, in the Wright camera it is caused by astigmatism. Since the RMS/P–V error ratio is smaller by a factor of 0.5^{1/2} for astigmatism, the actual quality flat-field radius in the latter is larger by a factor of 1.4.

On the other hand, the best (curved) image surface of the Schmidt is practically free from off-axis aberrations, hence clearly superior in quality to a best (flat) field in the Wright camera. Also, since the Wright camera requires twice as strong corrector to cancel spherical aberration of the mirror, its chromatic error is double that in a comparable Schmidt camera.

Both, more strongly aspherized corrector and, especially, strongly aspherized fast mirror (into a rather unpopular type of aspheric shape) of the Wright are a fabrication disadvantage. On the plus side, the Wright camera is only about half as long as an equivalent diameter Schmidt. Also, since the corrector in Wright's arrangement nearly coincides with the image plane, it can support the film/detector assembly, clearing the optical path from supporting vanes.
