= 1743 Schmidt =

Asteroid

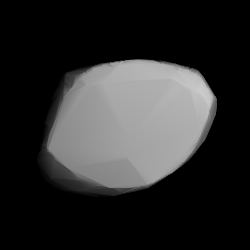
- Shape model of Schmidt from its lightcurve

Discovery
- Discovered by: C. J. van Houten; I. van Houten-G. T. Gehrels
- Discovery site: Palomar Obs.
- Discovery date: 24 September 1960

Designations
- Named after: Bernhard Schmidt (German optician)
- Alternative designations: 4109 P-L · 1931 BJ; 1939 CN · 1943 EA; 1947 GD · 1951 JU; 1952 QD
- Minor planet category: main-belt · (inner) background

Orbital characteristics
- Epoch 27 April 2019 (JD 2458600.5)
- Uncertainty parameter 0
- Observation arc: 87.76 yr (32,056 d)
- Aphelion: 2.8066 AU
- Perihelion: 2.1405 AU
- Semi-major axis: 2.4736 AU
- Eccentricity: 0.1346
- Orbital period (sidereal): 3.89 yr (1,421 d)
- Mean anomaly: 202.34°
- Mean motion: 0° 15^{m} 11.88^{s} / day
- Inclination: 6.3568°
- Longitude of ascending node: 189.64°
- Argument of perihelion: 359.51°

Physical characteristics
- Mean diameter: 17.00–17.01 km 17.28±1.4 km 18.230±6.626 km 19.062±0.133 km 19.338±0.105 km 20.69±0.31 km 20.78±0.43 km
- Synodic rotation period: 17.45 h
- Geometric albedo: 0.042; 0.045; 0.0495; 0.0502; 0.057; 0.06; 0.0603
- Spectral type: C (SMASS-I); B–V = 0.620; U–B = 0.260
- Absolute magnitude (H): 12.47; 12.48

1743 Schmidt, provisional designation 4109 P-L, is a dark background asteroid from the inner regions of the asteroid belt, approximately 19 kilometers (12 miles) in diameter. It was discovered during the Palomar–Leiden survey on 24 September 1960, by astronomers Ingrid and Cornelis van Houten at Leiden, on photographic plates taken by Tom Gehrels at Palomar Observatory in California. The C-type asteroid has a rotation period of 17.5 hours. It was named for the optician Bernhard Schmidt.

== Orbit and classification ==
Schmidt is a non-family asteroid from the main belt's background population. As it is located in the dynamical region of the Vesta family, the asteroid is potentially a Vestian interloper due to its completely different spectral type. It orbits the Sun in the inner asteroid belt at a distance of 2.1–2.8 AU once every 3 years and 11 months (1,421 days; semi-major axis of 2.47 AU). Its orbit has an eccentricity of 0.13 and an inclination of 6° with respect to the ecliptic. The body's observation arc begins with its first observation as 1931 BJ at the Lowell Observatory in January 1931, more than 29 years prior to its official discovery observation at Palomar Observatory.

=== Palomar–Leiden survey ===
The survey designation "P-L" stands for "Palomar–Leiden", named after the Palomar and Leiden Observatory, which collaborated on the fruitful Palomar–Leiden survey in the 1960s. Gehrels used Palomar's Samuel Oschin telescope (also known as the 48-inch Schmidt Telescope), and shipped the photographic plates to Ingrid and Cornelis van Houten at Leiden Observatory where astrometry was carried out. The trio are credited with the discovery of several thousand asteroid discoveries.

== Naming ==
This minor planet was named after Estonian-German optician and astronomer Bernhard Schmidt (1879–1935), who invented the Schmidt camera, a telescope design with a spherical primary mirror and an aspherical correcting lens, providing a wide field of view with little optical aberrations. Proposed by Paul Herget, the asteroid's official naming citation was published by the Minor Planet Center on 15 August 1970 (M.P.C. 3086).

== Physical characteristics ==
Schmidt is a common carbonaceous C-type asteroid as determined during the first phase of the Small Main-Belt Asteroid Spectroscopic Survey.

=== Rotation period and poles ===
In September 1983, a rotational lightcurve of Schmidt was obtained from photometric observations by Richard Binzel. Lightcurve analysis gave a rotation period of 17.45 hours with a brightness amplitude of 0.36 magnitude (U=3). A modeled lightcurve using photometric data from the Lowell Photometric Database was published in 2016. It gave a concurring period of 17.4599±0.0001 hours, as well as two spin axes at (69.0°, −62.0°) and (261.0°, −53.0°) in ecliptic coordinates (λ, β).

=== Diameter and albedo ===
According to the surveys carried out by the Infrared Astronomical Satellite IRAS, the Japanese Akari satellite and the NEOWISE mission of NASA's Wide-field Infrared Survey Explorer, Schmidt measures between 17.00 and 20.78 kilometers in diameter and its surface has an albedo between 0.042 and 0.0603.

The Collaborative Asteroid Lightcurve Link adopts the results obtained by IRAS, that is, an albedo of 0.0603 and a diameter of 17.28 kilometers based on an absolute magnitude of 12.48.
