= Advent Corporation =

Former consumer electronics manufacturer

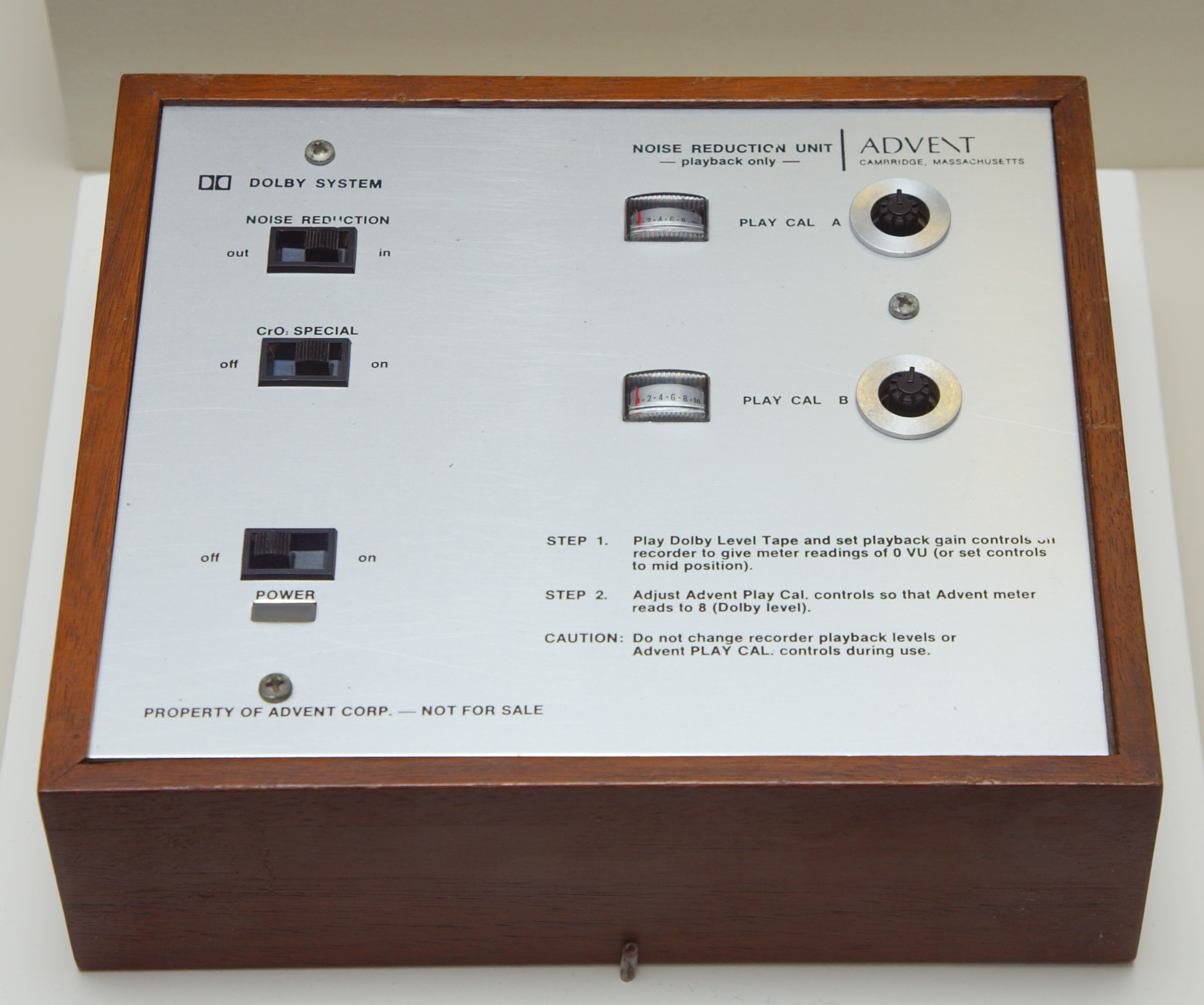
An early stand-alone Advent Dolby noise reduction unit, for tape playback use only. Later models also supported recording on tape.

Advent Corporation was a consumer audio and video hardware company founded in Cambridge, Massachusetts by Henry Kloss in 1967. It closed in 1981.

== Naming ==
The name came from the legal description the advent corporation used in the incorporation documents as a placeholder name before the actual name was selected.

== Products ==
Around 1968, Kloss quit KLH to develop a low-cost projection television, but had trouble financing the leading-edge research and development that was still required. To earn some money, he decided to build a high-performance low-cost dual driver speaker system with 10-inch (25 cm) woofer called simply The Advent Loudspeaker (later given the retronym the Larger Advent, after introduction of The Smaller Advent Loudspeaker). It rivaled the sound of the then top-line AR Model 3a (which used three drivers and a 12-inch (30 cm) woofer), but only cost about half as much.

Advent produced a number of different versions of the 2-way Advent, including the Advent Loudspeaker, the Smaller Advent Loudspeaker, the "New" Advent Loudspeaker, Advent/2, Advent/3, 4000 series, and 5000 series, to name a few. They were usually offered in both wood veneer and vinyl-covered "utility" cabinet versions, which other than appearance were acoustically identical.

The popularity of the Advent Loudspeaker overshadowed any other Advent products, even the eventually released first video projector for home, Advent VideoBeam 1000.

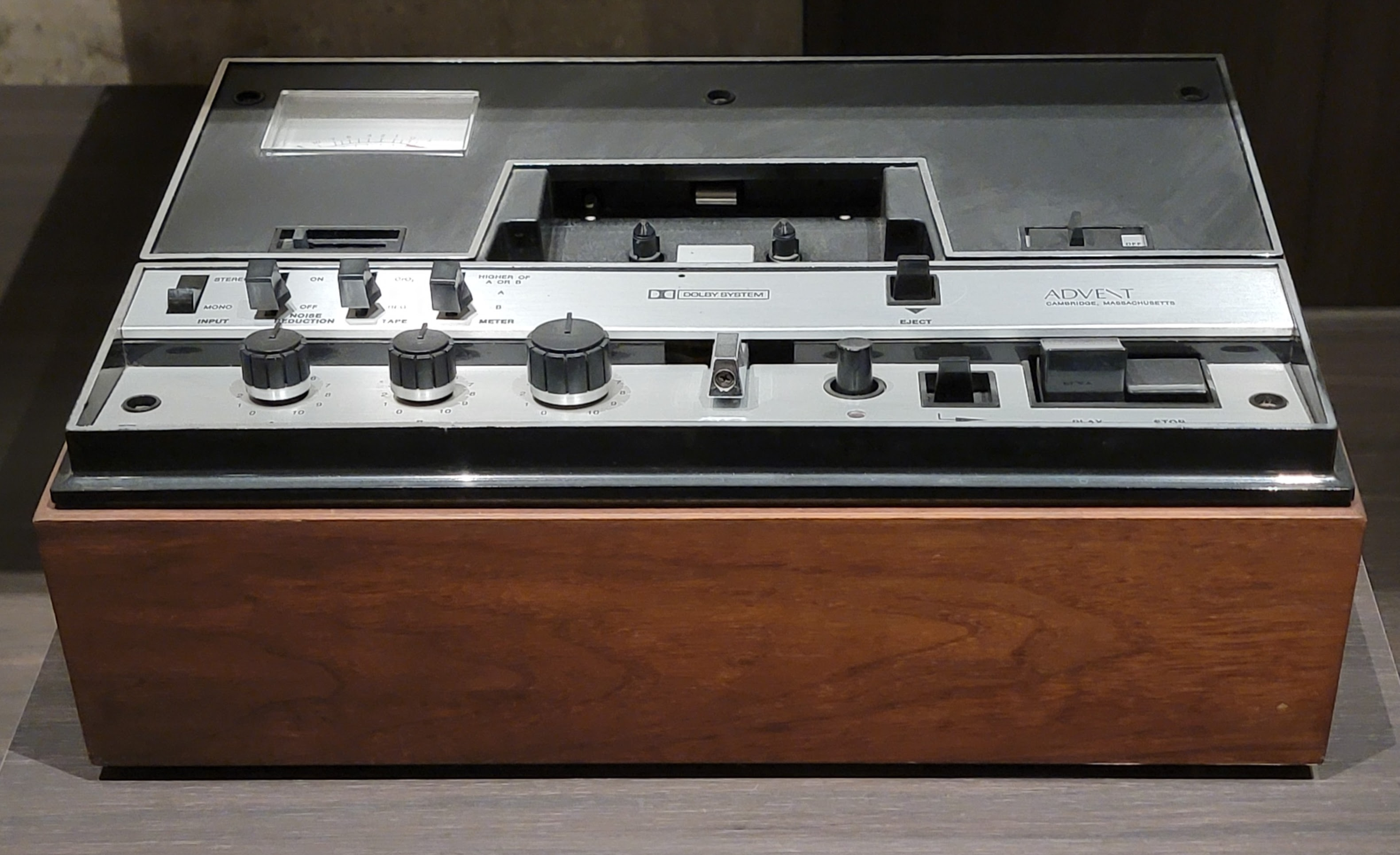
Advent tape recorder with Dolby noise-reduction system (ca. 1972)

Kloss then resumed work on increasing the fidelity of cassette tapes, a format that had originally been developed to be used only for voice dictation. The original Advent 200 model, launched in 1970, had exhibited mechanical problems and was quickly replaced by Advent 201 in 1971, incorporating Dolby B noise reduction (for both recording and playback), along with chromium dioxide tape in the first popular high fidelity cassette deck. Advent 201 was a "game changer":Stereo Review had found that it can successfully compete against more expensive reel-to-reel decks. Commercially it was not as successful as the loudspeakers were, but was manufactured for few years.

In 1972, the VideoBeam was finally released, the first large-screen projection television for home use. In 1977, Kloss founded Kloss Video Corporation (KVC) as a spin-off company. He invented the Novatron tube there, which increased the efficiency of projection TVs.

== Financial issues and closure ==
Advent continued to concentrate on low-cost high-performance consumer audio products. Eventually, long after Kloss' departure, Advent ran into hard times. Citing high labor costs, it closed its Cambridge factory in 1979, laying off most of its 650 workers, and moved production to New Hampshire. It did not thrive, and never emerged from a bankruptcy declared in March 1981. KVC passed on reacquiring the (by then) New Hampshire-based brand, which was later merged into Jensen Electronics, which in turn was acquired by Audiovox in 2004. KVC ran into increasing competition from Japanese manufacturers entering the now-proven market for large-format consumer TVs, eventually selling its assets and shutting down.

== Sources ==
- Singer, H.; Rosenblatt, B. (2023). Key Changes: The 10 Times Technology Transformed the Music Industry. Oxford University Press. ISBN 978-0-19-765689-1.
