= Schmidt camera =

Astrophotographic telescope

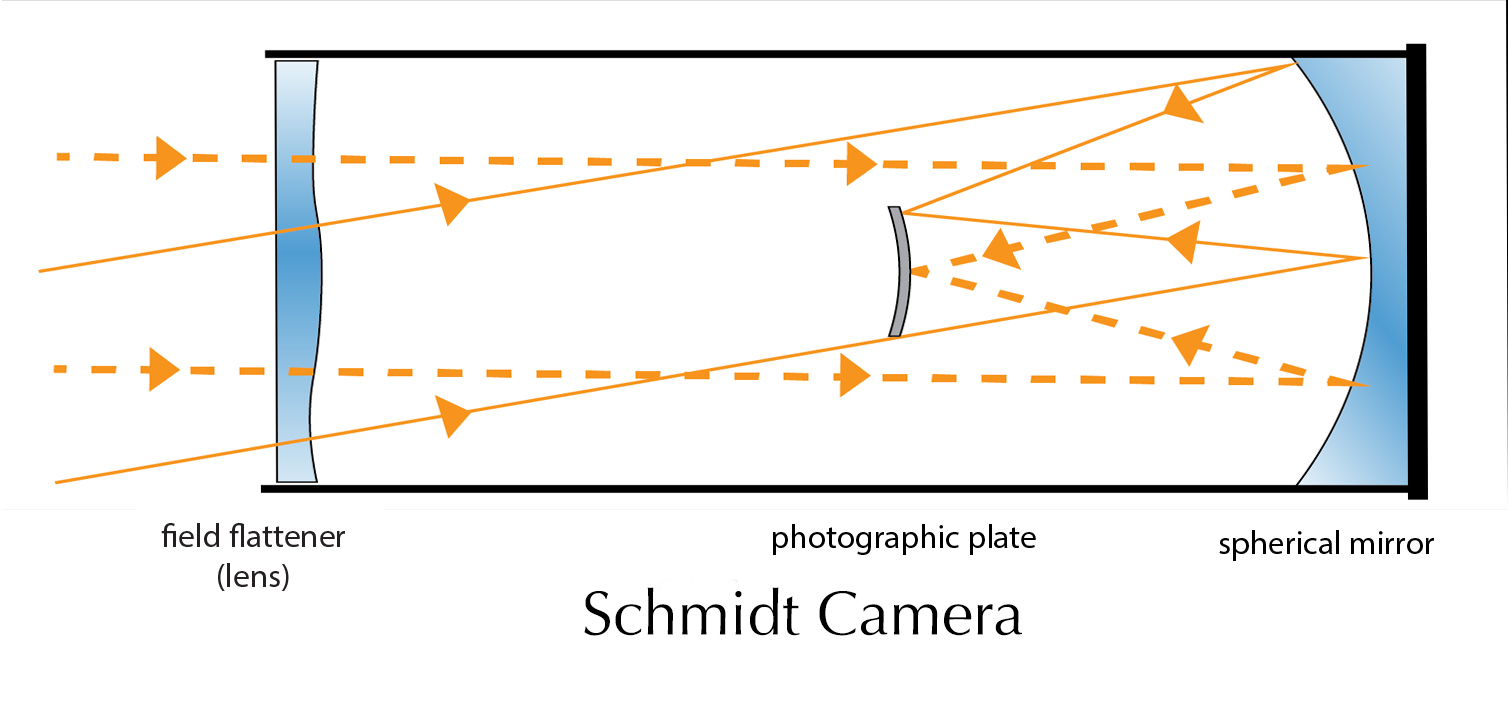
Diagram of Schmidt camera

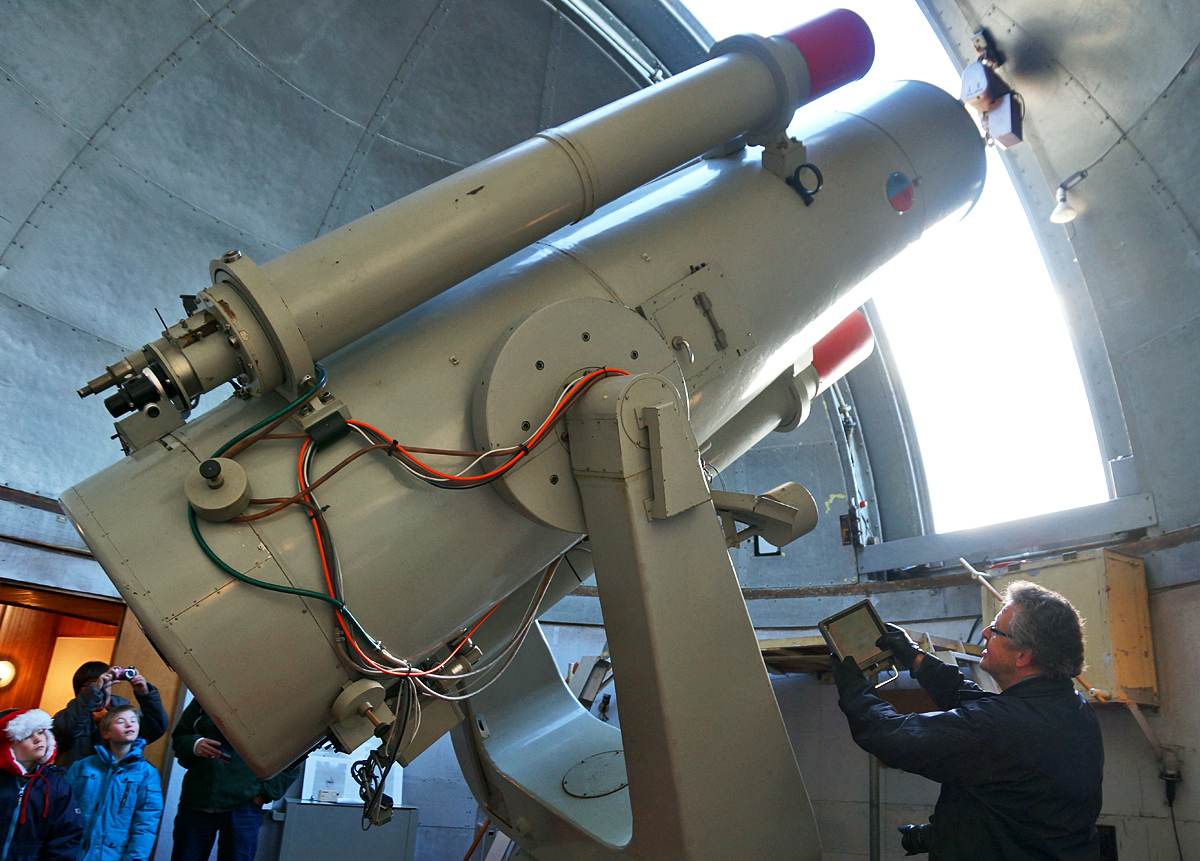
The 77 cm Schmidt-telescope from 1966 at Brorfelde Observatory was originally equipped with photographic film, and an engineer is here showing the film-box, which was then placed behind the locker at the center of the telescope (at the telescope's prime focus)

A Schmidt camera, also referred to as the Schmidt telescope, is a catadioptric astrophotographic telescope designed to provide wide fields of view with limited aberrations. The design was invented by Bernhard Schmidt in 1930.

Some notable examples are the Samuel Oschin telescope (formerly Palomar Schmidt), the UK Schmidt Telescope and the ESO Schmidt; these provided the major source of all-sky photographic imaging from 1950 until 2000, when electronic detectors took over. A recent example is the Kepler space telescope exoplanet finder.

Other related designs are the Wright camera and Lurie–Houghton telescope.

== Invention and design ==
The Schmidt camera was invented by Estonian-German optician Bernhard Schmidt in 1930. Its optical components are an easy-to-make spherical primary mirror, and an aspherical correcting lens, known as a Schmidt corrector plate, located at the center of curvature of the primary mirror. The film or other detector is placed inside the camera, at the prime focus. The design is noted for allowing very fast focal ratios, while controlling coma and astigmatism.

Schmidt cameras have very strongly curved focal planes, thus requiring that the film, plate, or other detector be correspondingly curved. In some cases the detector is made curved; in others flat media is mechanically conformed to the shape of the focal plane through the use of retaining clips or bolts, or by the application of a vacuum. A field flattener, in its simplest form a planoconvex lens in front of the film plate or detector, is sometimes used. Since the corrector plate is at the center of curvature of the primary mirror in this design the tube length can be very long for a wide-field telescope. There are also the drawbacks of having the obstruction of the film holder or detector mounted at the focus halfway up the tube assembly, a small amount of light is blocked and there is a loss in contrast in the image due to diffraction effects of the obstruction and its support structure.

=== Schmidt corrector plate ===
Exaggerated cross section of a Schmidt corrector plate. The real curves are hard to detect visually, giving the corrector plate the appearance of being an optically flat window.

A Schmidt corrector plate is an aspheric lens which corrects the spherical aberration introduced by the spherical primary mirror of the Schmidt or Schmidt–Cassegrain telescope designs. It was invented by Bernhard Schmidt in 1931, although it may have been independently invented by Finnish astronomer Yrjö Väisälä in 1924 (sometimes called the Schmidt–Väisälä camera as a result). Schmidt originally introduced it as part of a wide-field photographic catadioptric telescope, the Schmidt camera. It is now used in several other telescope designs, camera lenses and image projection systems that utilise a spherical primary mirror.

==== Function ====

Example of an optical system using just a spherical mirror (top) and a spherical mirror combined with a Schmidt corrector plate (bottom).

Schmidt corrector plates work because they are aspheric lenses with spherical aberration that is equal to but opposite of the spherical primary mirrors they are placed in front of. They are placed at the center of curvature "C" of the mirrors for a pure Schmidt camera and just behind the prime focus for a Schmidt–Cassegrain. The Schmidt corrector is thicker in the middle and the edge. This corrects the light paths so light reflected from the outer part of the mirror and light reflected from the inner portion of the mirror is brought to the same common focus "F". The Schmidt corrector only corrects for spherical aberration. It does not change the focal length of the system.

==== Manufacture ====
Schmidt corrector plates can be manufactured in many ways. The most basic method, called the "classical approach", involves directly figuring the corrector by grinding and polishing the aspherical shape into a flat glass blank using specially shaped and sized tools. This method requires a high degree of skill and training on the part of the optical engineer creating the corrector.

Schmidt himself worked out a second, more elegant, scheme for producing the complex figure needed for the correcting plate. A thin glass disk with a perfectly polished accurate flat surface on both sides was placed on a heavy rigid metal pan. The top surface of the pan around the edge of the glass disk was ground at a precise angle or bevel based on the coefficient of elasticity of the particular type of glass that was being used. The glass plate was sealed to the ground edge of the pan. Then a vacuum pump was used to exhaust the air between the pan and glass through a small hole in the center of the pan until a particular negative pressure had been achieved. This caused the glass plate to warp slightly. The exposed upper surface of the glass was then ground and polished spherical. When the vacuum was released, the lower surface of the plate returned to its original flat form while the upper surface had the aspheric figure needed for a Schmidt corrector plate. Schmidt's vacuum figuring method is rarely used today. Holding the shape by constant vacuum is difficult and errors in the o-ring seal and even contamination behind the plate could induce optical errors. The glass plate could also break if bent enough to generate a curve for telescopes of focal ratio f/2.5 or faster. Also, for fast focal ratios, the curve obtained is not sufficiently exact and requires additional hand correction.

A third method, invented in 1970 for Celestron by Tom Johnson and John O'rourke, uses a vacuum pan with the correct shape of the curve pre-shaped into the bottom of the pan, called a "master block". The upper exposed surface is then polished flat creating a corrector with the correct shape once the vacuum is released. This removes the need to have to hold a shape by applying an exact vacuum and allows for the mass production of corrector plates of the same exact shape.

The technical difficulties associated with the production of Schmidt corrector plates led some designers, such as Dmitri Dmitrievich Maksutov and Albert Bouwers, to come up with alternative designs using more conventional meniscus corrector lenses.

== Applications ==
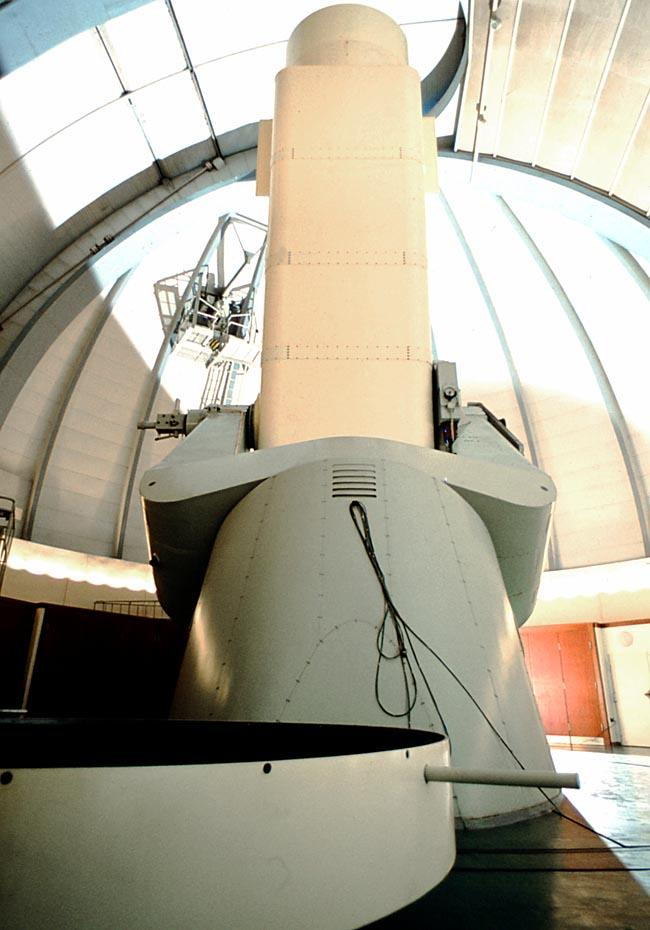
The 2 meter diameter Alfred Jensch Telescope at the Karl Schwarzschild Observatory in Tautenburg, Thuringia, Germany is the largest Schmidt camera in the world.

Because of its wide field of view, the Schmidt camera is typically used as a survey instrument, for research programs in which a large amount of sky must be covered. These include astronomical surveys, comet and asteroid searches, and nova patrols.

In addition, Schmidt cameras and derivative designs are frequently used for tracking artificial Earth satellites.

=== Ground-based ===
The first relatively large Schmidt telescopes were built at Hamburg Observatory and Palomar Observatory shortly before World War II. Between 1945 and 1980, about eight more large (1 meter or larger) Schmidt telescopes were built around the world.

One particularly famous and productive Schmidt camera is the Oschin Schmidt Telescope at Palomar Observatory, completed in 1948. This instrument was used in the National Geographic Society – Palomar Observatory Sky Survey (POSS, 1958), the POSS-II survey, the Palomar-Leiden (asteroid) Surveys, and other projects.

The European Southern Observatory with a 1-meter Schmidt telescope at La Silla and the UK Science Research Council with a 1.2 meter Schmidt telescope at Siding Spring Observatory engaged in a collaborative sky survey to complement the first Palomar Sky Survey, but focusing on the southern hemisphere. The technical improvements developed during this survey encouraged the development of the Second Palomar Observatory Sky Survey (POSS II).

The telescope used in the Lowell Observatory Near-Earth-Object Search (LONEOS) is also a Schmidt camera. The Schmidt telescope of the Karl Schwarzschild Observatory is the largest Schmidt camera of the world.

=== Space-based ===
A Schmidt telescope was at the heart of the Hipparcos (1989–1993) satellite from the European Space Agency. This was used in the Hipparcos Survey which mapped the distances of more than a million stars with unprecedented accuracy: it included 99% of all stars up to magnitude 11. The spherical mirror used in this telescope was extremely accurate; if scaled up to the size of the Atlantic Ocean, bumps on its surface would be about 10 cm high.

The Kepler photometer, mounted on NASA's Kepler space telescope (2009–2018), is the largest Schmidt camera launched into space.

=== Other applications ===
In 1977 at Yerkes Observatory, a small Schmidt telescope was used to derive an accurate optical position for the planetary nebula NGC 7027 to allow comparison between photographs and radio maps of the object.

Starting in the early 1970s, Celestron marketed an 8-inch Schmidt camera. The camera was focused in the factory and was made of materials with low expansion coefficients so it would never need to be focused in the field. Early models required the photographer to cut and develop individual frames of 35 mm film, as the film holder could only hold one frame of film. About 300 Celestron Schmidt cameras were produced.

The Schmidt system was popular, used in reverse, for television projection systems, notably the Advent design by Henry Kloss. Large Schmidt projectors were used in theaters, but systems as small as 8 inches were made for home use and other small venues.

== List of Schmidt cameras ==
Observatory	Location	Aperture	Built	Used for	Notes
Palomar	USA	46 cm	1936	Proof of concept	First in North America
Hamburg	Germany	60 cm	1930	First Schmidt camera	Built by Bernhard Schmidt
Palomar	USA	122 cm	1948	Palomar Observatory Sky Survey	Samuel Oschin telescope
La Silla	Chile	100 cm	1971	Southern sky surveys	ESO 1-metre Schmidt
Byurakan	Armenia	102 cm	1961	Markarian galaxy surveys	–
Karl Schwarzschild	Germany	134 cm	1960	Wide-field surveys	Alfred Jensch Telescope
Asiago	Italy	67 cm	1966	Comet and asteroid studies	–
Calar Alto	Spain	80 cm	1955	Sky surveys in Europe	Moved from Hamburg in 1980
Kiso	Japan	105 cm	1974	Supernova and variable star studies	–
Konkoly	Hungary	60 cm	1962	Minor planet research	At Piszkéstető Station
Siding Spring	Australia	120 cm	1973	Southern sky surveys	UK Schmidt Telescope
Uppsala	Sweden	85 cm	1963	Northern sky surveys	At Kvistaberg Station
Kepler	Space-based	95 cm	2009	Exoplanet detection	Kepler photometer

== Derivative designs ==
=== Lensless Schmidt ===
In the 1930s, Schmidt noted that the corrector plate could be replaced with a simple aperture at the mirror's center of curvature for a slow (numerically high f-ratio) camera. Such a design was used to construct a working 1/8-scale model of the Palomar Schmidt, with a 5° field. The retronym "lensless Schmidt" has been given to this configuration.

=== Schmidt–Väisälä ===
Yrjö Väisälä originally designed an "astronomical camera" similar to Bernhard Schmidt's "Schmidt camera", but the design was unpublished. Väisälä did mention it in lecture notes in 1924 with a footnote: "problematic spherical focal plane". Once Väisälä saw Schmidt's publication, he promptly went ahead and solved the field-flattening problem in Schmidt's design by placing a doubly convex lens slightly in front of the film holder. This resulting system is known as: Schmidt–Väisälä camera or sometimes as Väisälä camera.

=== Baker–Schmidt ===
In 1940, James Baker of Harvard University modified the Schmidt camera design to include a convex secondary mirror, which reflected light back toward the primary. The photographic plate was then installed near the primary, facing the sky. This variant is called the Baker-Schmidt camera.

=== Baker–Nunn ===
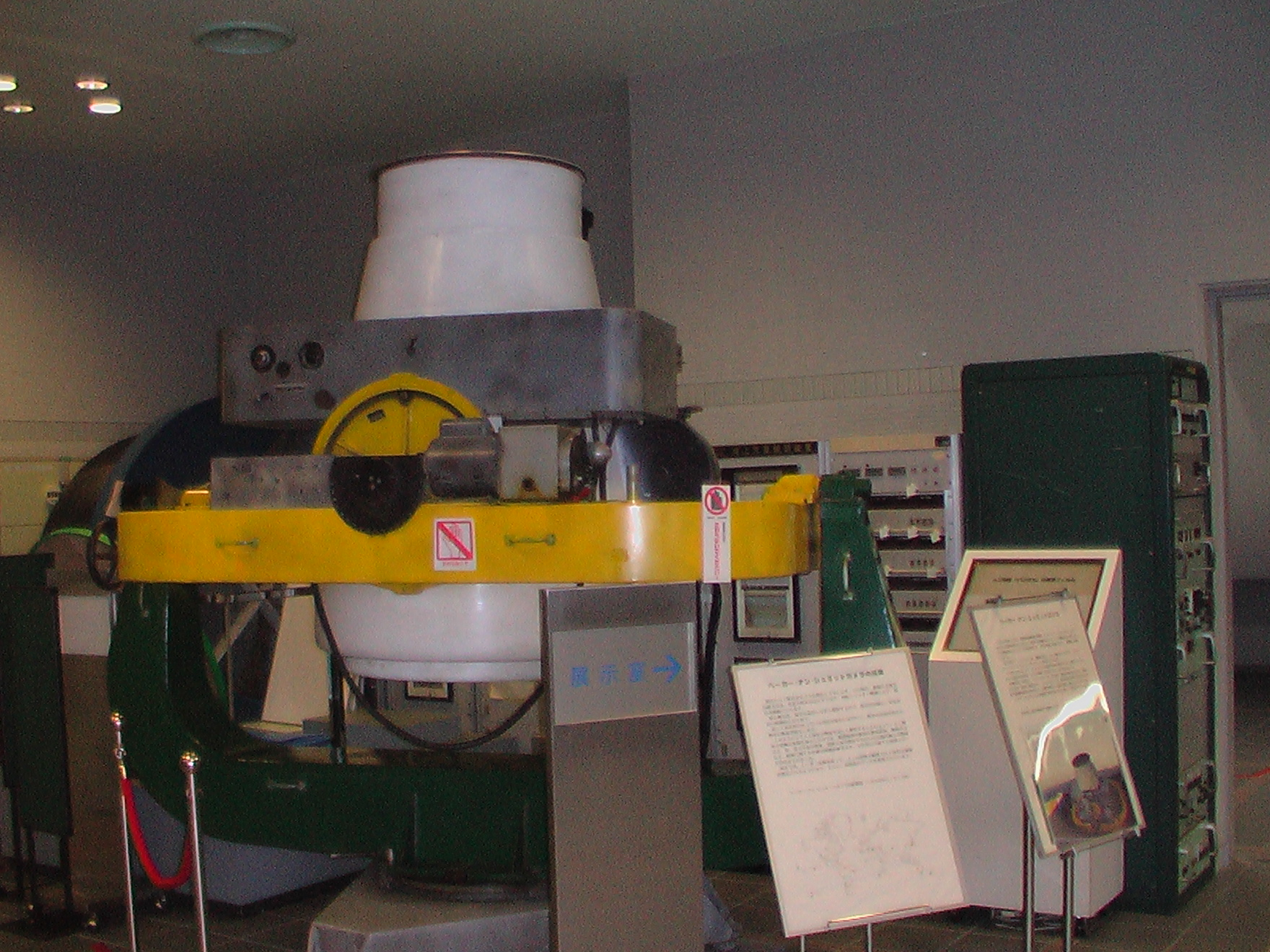
One of the Baker–Nunn cameras originally used by the Smithsonian satellite-tracking program

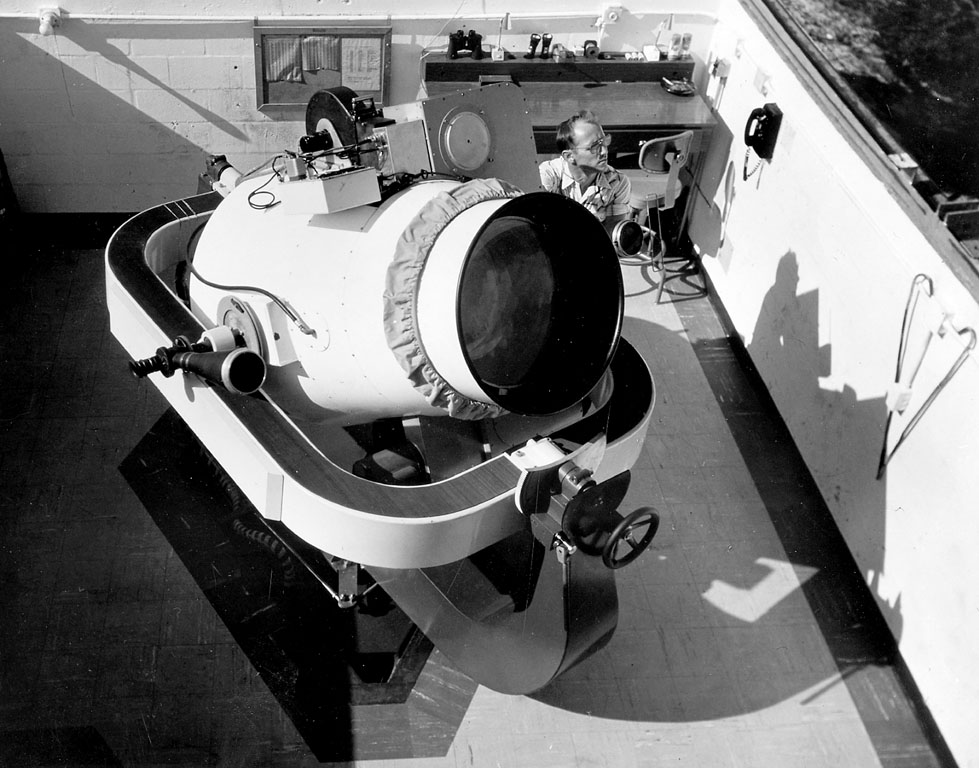
A Baker-Nunn satellite tracking camera in use.

The Baker–Nunn design, by Baker and Joseph Nunn, replaces the Baker-Schmidt camera's corrector plate with a small triplet corrector lens closer to the focus of the camera. It used a 55 mm wide film derived from the Cinemascope 55 motion picture process. A dozen f/0.75 Baker-Nunn cameras with 20-inch apertures – each weighing 3.5 tons including a multiple axis mount allowing it to follow satellites in the sky – were used by the Smithsonian Astrophysical Observatory to track artificial satellites from June 1958 until the mid-1970s.

A few Baker-Nunn telescopes were repurposed for astronomical use after their satellite tracking days were over.

=== Mersenne–Schmidt ===
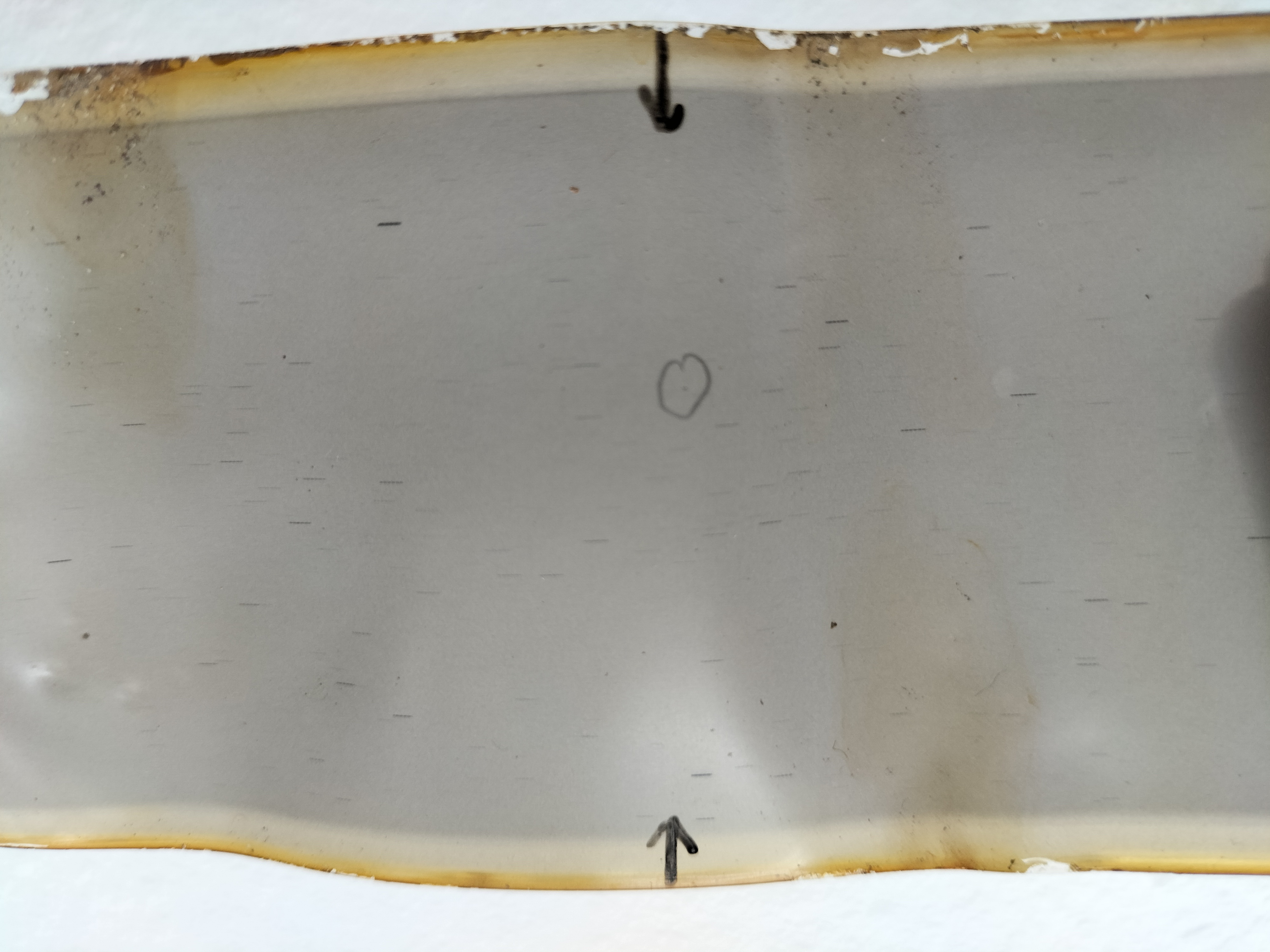
Image from a 55mm film reel of the Baker-Nunn camera in Naini Tal (India). The artificial satellite has been circled in black by the operator. Discovered in 2024 on the Bossons Glacier. The film was aboard Air India Flight 101, which crashed on Mont Blanc on January 24, 1966.

The Mersenne–Schmidt camera consists of a concave paraboloidal primary mirror, a convex spherical secondary mirror, and a concave spherical tertiary mirror. The first two mirrors (a Mersenne configuration) perform the same function of the correcting plate of the conventional Schmidt. This form was invented by Paul in 1935. A later paper by Baker introduced the Paul-Baker design, a similar configuration but with a flat focal plane.

=== Schmidt–Newton ===
The addition of a flat secondary mirror at 45° to the optical axis of the Schmidt design creates a Schmidt–Newtonian telescope.

=== Schmidt–Cassegrain ===
The addition of a convex secondary mirror to the Schmidt design directing light through a hole in the primary mirror creates a Schmidt–Cassegrain telescope.

The last two designs are popular with telescope manufacturers because they are compact and use simple spherical optics.

== See also ==
- List of telescope types
- Maksutov telescope
- Meniscus corrector
- Wright camera
