= Schmidt–Newtonian telescope =

Type of catadioptric telescope

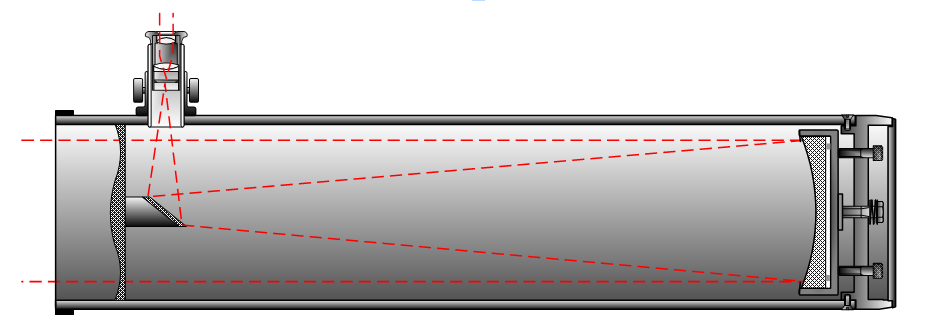
Schmidt–Newtonian telescope.

A Schmidt–Newtonian telescope or Schmidt–Newton telescope is a catadioptric telescope that combines elements from both the Schmidt camera and the Newtonian telescope. In this telescope design, a spherical primary mirror is combined with a Schmidt corrector plate, which corrects the spherical aberration and holds the secondary mirror. The resulting system has less coma and diffraction effects than a Newtonian telescope with a parabolic mirror (which is free of spherical aberration but not free of coma) and a "spider" secondary mirror support. The design uses a 45° flat secondary mirror to view the image, as in a standard Newtonian telescope.

== Advantages ==
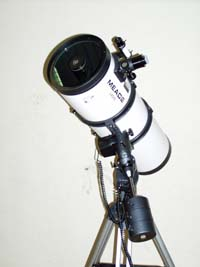
Schmidt–Newtonian telescope from Meade

Schmidt–Newtonian telescopes offer images with less coma than Newtonian telescopes of the same focal ratio (usually about half). The corrector plate also helps to seal the tube assembly from air currents, and provides mounting point for the diagonal mirror, eliminating the diffraction effects from a "spider" secondary support. The all-spherical surfaces are much easier to manufacture, especially in short focal ratios. Telescopes using this design typically have a short focal ratio of around f/4, making them well suited for astrophotography or CCD imaging. Schmidt–Newtonians also typically cost less than the more commonly produced Schmidt–Cassegrain telescopes since they don't have the added curved secondary mirror or the complicated primary mirror focusing mechanism found in most Schmidt–Cassegrain designs.

== See also ==
- List of telescope types
- Schmidt camera
- Schmidt–Cassegrain telescope
