= Petzval lens =

First photographic portrait objective lens

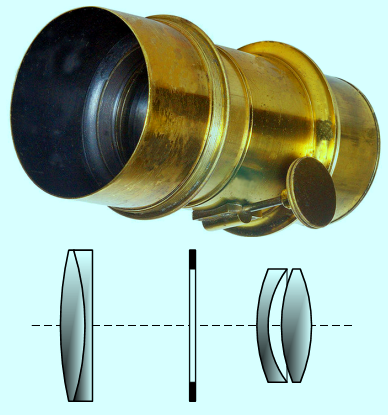
Petzval portrait lens

The Petzval objective, or Petzval lens, is the first photographic portrait objective lens (with a 160 mm focal length) in the history of photography. It was developed by the Slovak mathematics professor Joseph Petzval in 1840 in Vienna, with technical advice provided by Peter Wilhelm Friedrich von Voigtländer. The Voigtländer company went on to build the first Petzval lens in 1840 on behalf of Petzval, whereupon it became known throughout Europe. Later, the optical instruments maker Carl Dietzler in Vienna also produced the Petzval lens.

== History ==
The Voigtländer-Petzval objective lens was revolutionary and attracted the attention of the scientific world because it was the first mathematically calculated precision objective in the history of photography. Petzval's lens established two new features: firstly, it was faster compared to previous lenses, with a maximum aperture of 1:3.6. In comparison to Daguerre's daguerreotype camera lens of 1839, Petzval's design had 22 times the light-gathering capacity, which for the first time enabled portraits under favorable conditions with exposure times of less than a minute.

Additionally, Petzval calculated for the first time the composition of the lenses based on optical laws, whereas optics before had previously been ground and polished according to experience. For the calculations, 8 artillery gunners and 3 corporals were made available to Petzval by Archduke Louis of Austria (commander of the artillery), since the artillery was one of the few professions in which mathematical calculations were made.

By 1845, Petzval's collaboration with Voigtländer, who held the license to produce the lenses, had become "mired in disputes". Voigtländer moved production outside of Austria and therefore beyond Petzval's patent limitations. The Petzval objective was produced by Voigtländer and sold worldwide; by 1862, Voigtländer had produced 60,000 pieces.

One disadvantage of Petzval's design was a sharp drop in sharpness at the edges, which was corrected in the Aplanat lens developed by Hugo Adolph Steinheil.

== Optical design ==
The lens consisted of two doublet lenses with an aperture stop in between. The front lens is well corrected for spherical aberrations but introduces coma. The second doublet corrects for this and the position of the stop corrects most of the astigmatism. However, this results in additional field curvature and vignetting. The total field of view is therefore restricted to about 30 degrees. An f-number of f/3.6 was achievable, which was considerably faster than other lenses of the time.

== Lens revival ==
Between 1962 and 1972, the United States used a petzval lens in the KH-4 through KH-4B cameras. Produced by Itek, these cameras were a part of the CORONA satellite program. This program was a secret photoreconnaissance satellite program meant to image the Earth's surface and targeted nations such as the USSR. At the end of the program, the camera resolution was about two meters.

In 2013, Lomography successfully launched a crowdfunding campaign at kickstarter.com to produce a new Petzval lens in Russia for film and digital cameras.

Lensbaby offers Petzval lenses for modern cameras under the Burnside and Twist names.

In 2019, TLS rehoused the Lomography lens for use on professional cinema cameras using the PL mount. The 58mm and 85mm versions were used in the 2023 feature film Poor Things.

== Petzval telescopes ==
A petzval telescope is a type of refractor telescope that follows the design of the petzval lens system. These petzval telescopes are widely used in astrophotography due to their well-corrected optics. Unlike most refractors and reflectors, petzval telescopes have a uniform, distortion-free image across the entire field of view. In standard refractors, the curvature of the front objective lens can cause stretched or elongated stars. This requires astronomers to use a corrective field-flattener or field-flattener reducers to correct the distortion. However, with a petzval lens design, the second lens group is used to correct for this curvature, eliminating the need for a field-flattener.

Many of the petzval designed telescopes are quadruplets designs, containing four glass elements within the telescope. At least one of these glass elements, typically in the front optic, is extra-low dispersion glass (ED). ED glass help reduce chromatic aberrations which helps with color accuracy and image quality.

Petzval telescopes are mainly marketed towards astrophotographers as the flat-field and well-corrected optics make it ideal for imaging. Some petzval telescopes include a visual back allowing for visual use, however some designs do not include one.

== Image gallery ==
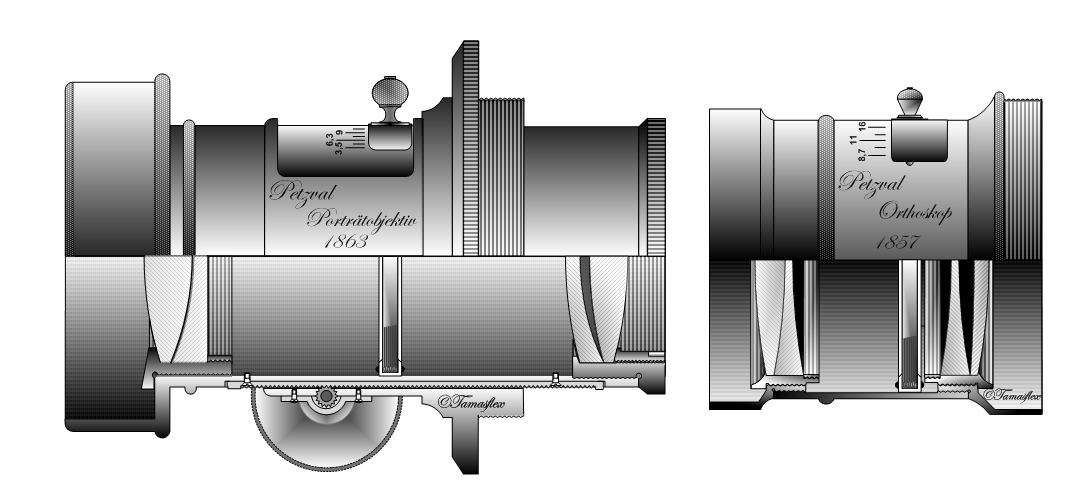
Cross section view of Petzval objectives: Portrait objective (German Porträtobjektiv) and ocular lens (German Orthoskop).

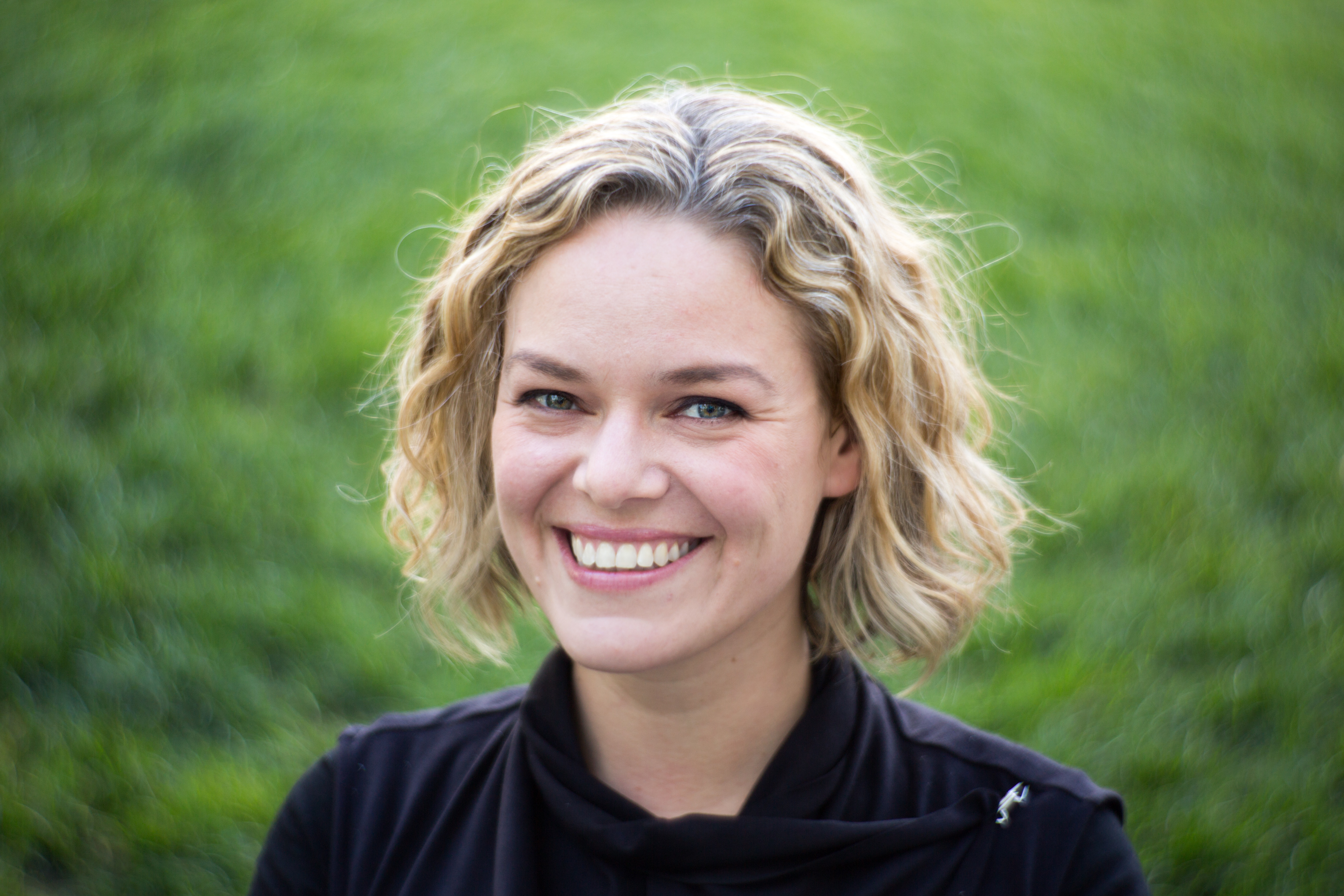
An example of a portrait photo (of Katherine Maher) taken with a Lomography-produced Petzval lens. Note the unique 'swirly' bokeh.

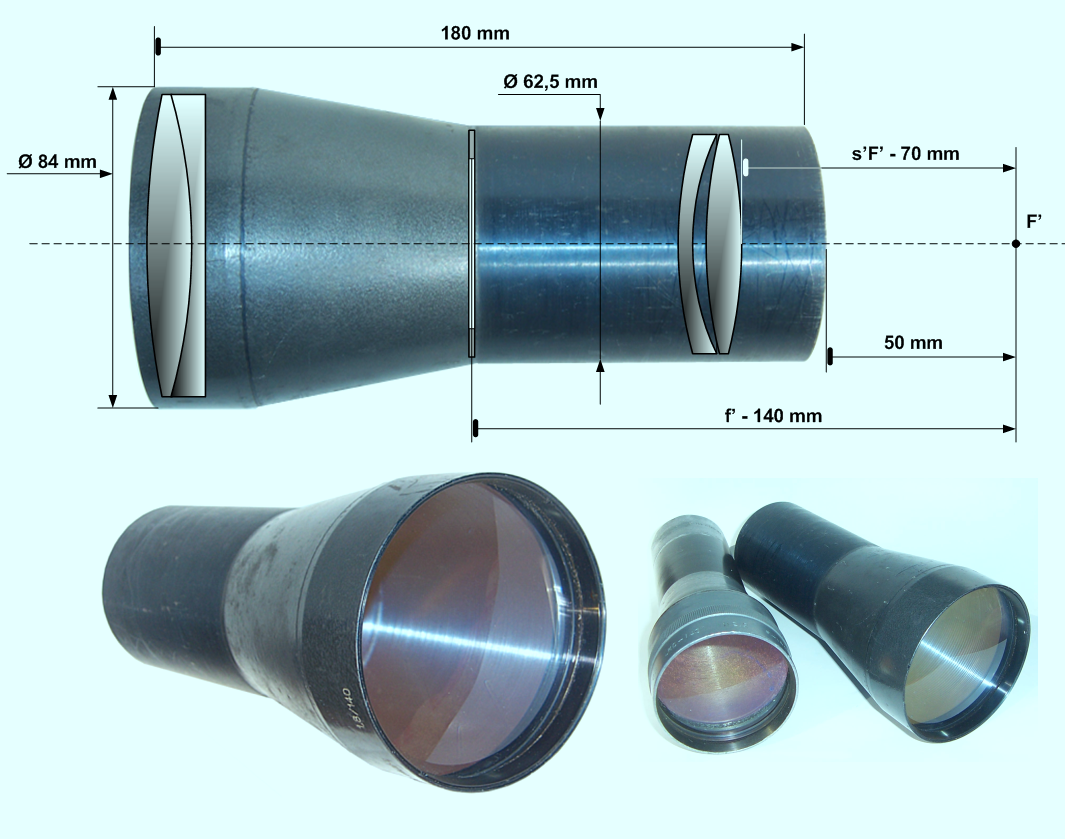
Petzval type movie projection lens
