= Bernhard Schmidt =

Estonian optician (1879–1935)

Bernhard Woldemar Schmidt
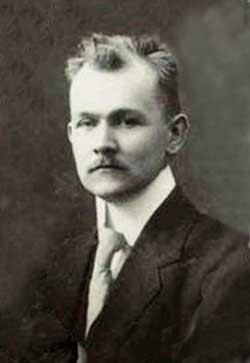
- Born: 11 April [O.S. 30 March] 1879; Nargen, Russian Empire (now Naissaar, Estonia)
- Died: 1 December 1935 (aged 56); Hamburg, Germany
- Education: University of Mittweida
- Known for: Invention of the Schmidt telescope

Bernhard Woldemar Schmidt was an Estonian optician. In 1930 he invented the Schmidt telescope, which corrected for the optical errors of spherical aberration, coma, and astigmatism, making possible for the first time the construction of very large, wide-angled reflective cameras of short exposure time for astronomical research.

== Childhood ==
Schmidt was the son of Carl Constantin and Marie Helene Christine (née Rosen) Schmidt. He was born and grew up on the island of Nargen (Naissaar), off the coast of Reval (Tallinn), Estonia, then part of the Russian Empire. The inhabitants of this island, mainly Estonian Swedes, generally spoke Swedish or Estonian, but the Schmidt family also spoke German. Bernhard was the oldest of six children, three boys (one of whom died in infancy) and three girls.

Naissaar was a small, rural island whose population mainly supported themselves through fishing and piloting ships into the port of Reval. With his younger brother August Fredrik, Bernhard Schmidt engaged in many childhood adventures on the island. He was an extremely inquisitive, inventive, and imaginative young person and adult. For example, when young he built his own camera from a purchased lens and old concertina bellows and succeeded in photographing his local surroundings and various family members, and even sold some of his photos. He also became fascinated with the night sky and constellations.

One misadventure proved tragic and marked Schmidt for the rest of his life. When he was 15 years old, he experimented with gunpowder. He packed an iron pipe with a charge, but through a mistake with the fuse the pipe exploded, and he lost the thumb and index finger of his right hand. Despite his mother's attempts to clean and bandage the wounds, surgeons in Tallinn later amputated the whole hand. This event appears to have deepened his reserve and introspection, qualities well noted by his contemporaries in later life.

== Youth ==
In spite of his loss, Schmidt was soon experimenting and inventing again. He also took more photos and became adept at developing and printing them. In 1895 he moved to Tallinn, and for a time worked at retouching photographs. Later he worked for the Volta Electrical Motor Works and became skilled in drafting. In 1901 he went to Gothenburg, Sweden, to study at the Chalmers University of Technology, but soon thereafter switched to the University of Mittweida in the Kingdom of Saxony to further his education.

== Adulthood ==
During this period his interest in astronomy and optics increased. In Mittweida he had hoped to study with Dr. Karl Strehl, a noted optical theorist. Strehl, however, had recently departed the university. Gradually, Schmidt found his true calling, namely the grinding and polishing of highly precise optics for astronomical applications. He seems to have begun the grinding of mirrors sometime around 1901, and thereafter began to sell some of his products to amateur astronomers. By March 1904, he had made so much progress in his new endeavor that after finishing his studies, he was soon in contact with professionals at the major observatories in Germany. His business rapidly took off when noted astronomers such as Hermann Carl Vogel, and Karl Schwarzschild realized the excellence of Schmidt's mirrors for their researches.

== Mittweida years ==
Between 1904 and 1914, Schmidt's business boomed and he acquired an immense reputation in Germany. Not only did he produce some of the most difficult and precise mirrors ever attempted up to that time, but he was entrusted with correcting and improving lenses originally supplied by famous optical houses, for example the 50 cm Steinheil visual refractor at the Potsdam Astrophysical Observatory. As his business increased, he hired several assistants, two of whom have left valuable accounts of Schmidt's working methods. Schmidt also bought an automobile, a rare luxury then, and employed a friend as chauffeur. Using a long focus horizontal mirror and a plane coelostat, both of his own manufacture, he took impressive photos of the sun, moon and major planets.

World War I brought the boom to an end. Schmidt was arrested as an enemy-alien, as Estonia belonged to the Russian Empire, and was sent to an internment camp for about six months. After his release, he remained under police control and some of his suspicious-looking astronomical equipment was confiscated. He attempted to continue his business, but as the war dragged on and turned to defeat for Germany, the economy became grim and scientists had no money for astronomy. The situation did not improve after the war because of the political turmoil in Germany and the need to pay war reparations. Inflation galloped out of control in 1923 and many people lost their entire savings. By the mid-1920s, Schmidt's business was ruined and he had to liquidate his remaining equipment as junk.

== Bergedorf ==
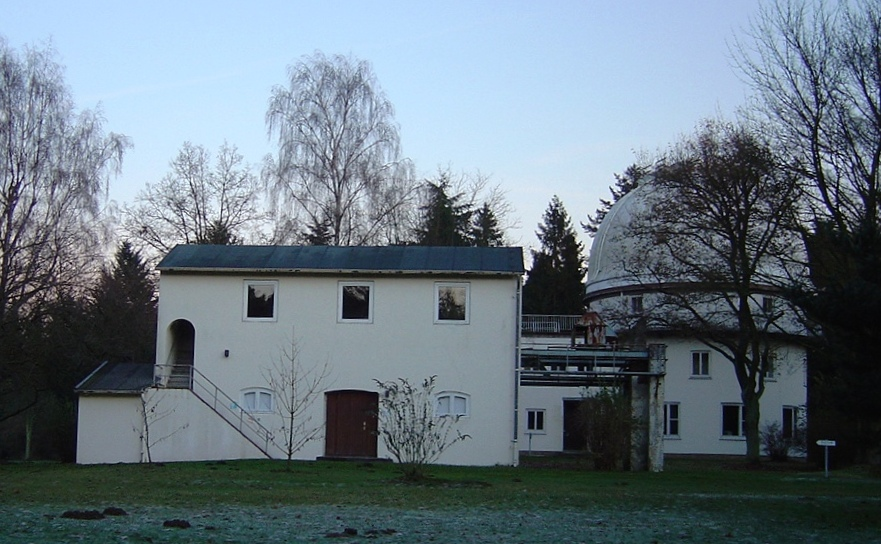
Schmidt Museum at Hamburg Observatory, Bergedorf

From 1916 onward Schmidt had been in contact with Professor Richard Schorr, the director of the Hamburg Observatory, a facility located outside Hamburg in the countryside near the village of Bergedorf. Schorr had become interested in Schmidt's horizontal mirror and coelostat telescope and ordered one to be built for his observatory. After the war when Schmidt's economic situation became increasingly difficult, Schmidt began making overtures to Schorr for some kind of work at the observatory. Schorr had only a little to offer: Schmidt could come to Bergedorf and lodge for free; there was repair work to do on the horizontal telescope, for which he would be paid a small fee. This was in 1926. For a time Schmidt did not accept. He had a number of patents to his credit, one of which involved using a wind-driven propeller to power boats forward. Schmidt hoped to turn this invention into something profitable. He also went back to Estonia for a family visit and to scout out opportunities in optics, as Estonia had become an independent republic after World War I.

Nothing came of these efforts, and by 1927 Schmidt's prospects were so poor that he accepted Schorr's offer. He began to establish a workshop in the basement of the Main Service Building at the observatory and to repair the horizontal telescope. During 1927 and 1929, Schmidt participated in two solar eclipse expeditions mounted by the Hamburg Observatory, the first to northern Sweden and the second to the Philippines. It was during this second trip that Schmidt announced to his companion, the astronomer Walter Baade, the most important invention of Schmidt's lifetime, indeed an invention that revolutionized astronomy and optical design in the second half of the 20th century, namely his wide-angle reflective camera.

== The Schmidt camera ==
Astronomers had long wished for a way to photograph large swathes of the sky quickly for the purpose of surveying the visible contents of the universe and seeing large-scale structures. Ordinary telescopes up till Schmidt's time showed narrow fields of view, typically measuring 1 or 2 degrees in diameter. Surveying the whole sky with such telescopes required an enormous investment of time and resources over years and (because of the narrow views) tended to miss large structures. It was possible to see large swathes with small camera lenses, but then faint (and hence far away) objects would remain invisible. What was needed was large aperture cameras possessing wide fields of good imaging properties ("definition"), and fast focal ratios to decrease exposure times.

Unfortunately, the only large aperture wide-field telescopes before Schmidt were ordinary reflecting telescopes of short focal ratio (about f/3), and these presented images which while sharp at the middle of their fields of view, quickly lost their definition away from the field center. Star images became bloated and comet-shaped, with the head of the "comet" pointing to the middle of the photographic field. This bloating results mainly from the optical aberrations (i.e. errors) called "coma" and "astigmatism". Before Schmidt it was impossible to build a large, fast reflector telescope which was not plagued by these errors.

Schmidt was well aware of this and had been pondering possible solutions during the late 1920s. According to Baade, he had abandoned at least one solution already, when finally he hit upon his ultimate design, which involved a novel, indeed bold departure from traditional optical designs. Schmidt realized that by employing a large spherically shaped mirror (instead of the normal paraboloidal mirror of a reflector telescope) and a smaller apertured diaphragm placed at the center of curvature of the mirror, he could at a stroke eliminate coma and astigmatism. He would be left, however, with spherical aberration which is just as damaging to image sharpness.

Schmidt realized that he could eliminate the spherical aberration by placing a thin, very weakly curved aspheric lens (now called the "Schmidt corrector plate") at the same center of curvature as the apertured diaphragm. This aspheric lens has a complex curve that is convex near its middle and concave near its periphery that creates the opposite spherical aberration of the spherical mirror it is paired with, canceling out the mirror's spherical aberration. In this way, very neatly and simply he could construct a large camera of f/1.75 or even faster, that would give sharp images across a field more than 15 degrees in diameter, making it possible to image large swathes of sky with short exposures (on the order of a few minutes versus an hour or more with a conventional reflector). His first camera had an aperture of about 360 mm or 14.5" in diameter, and a focal ratio of f/1.75. It is now housed in a museum at the Hamburg Observatory. Schmidt's combining of diverse optical elements (a special mirror, a diaphragm at a particular location, and a "correction plate") into a simple catadioptric system, based on reasoning from first principles, was epoch making. In particular, the "correction plate" was like nothing ever seen before in telescope design. After Schmidt a flood of new catadioptric designs appeared in the subsequent decades.

Today the Schmidt–Cassegrain telescopes contain the Schmidt's correction plate, and these are today the most popular computerized amateur telescopes.

== Last years ==
Schmidt built his first "Schmidtspiegel" (which came to be known as the Schmidt camera) in 1930, a breakthrough which caused a sensation around the world. He employed a very clever method (the so-called "vacuum pan" method) to make the difficult "corrector plate", so that the system gave superb images. The vacuum pan involved carefully warping a parallel glass plate under partial vacuum into a slight sagging curve and then polishing the upper curve flat. After release of the vacuum, the lens would spring back into the "Schmidt shape" needed for the camera. No one had ever made a lens in this way before.

Schmidt published a brief account (in German) of his invention in professional publications, and offered to build his cameras for professional observatories. Unfortunately, his publicity was too little and his design was too novel. Moreover, the invention coincided with the beginning of the Great Depression. No orders came in and he remained dependent on Schorr and Bergedorf for a modest income from occasional jobs till the end of his life. He produced a larger camera in 1934 and reground the 60 cm Bergedorf-Steinheil photographic refractor as well.

Schmidt fell ill at the end of November 1935 after a business trip to Leiden in the Netherlands. Despite attempts at treatment, he died on 1 December 1935 in Hamburg at the age of 56. A postmortem revealed that he was suffering from a lung infection.

In book 2 of "I Wish I'd Been There, European History c.2008 by American Historical Publications, Freeman Dyson wrote, "He (Schmidt) bought a sufficient supply of cognac and quietly drank himself to death."

== Personal life and legacy ==
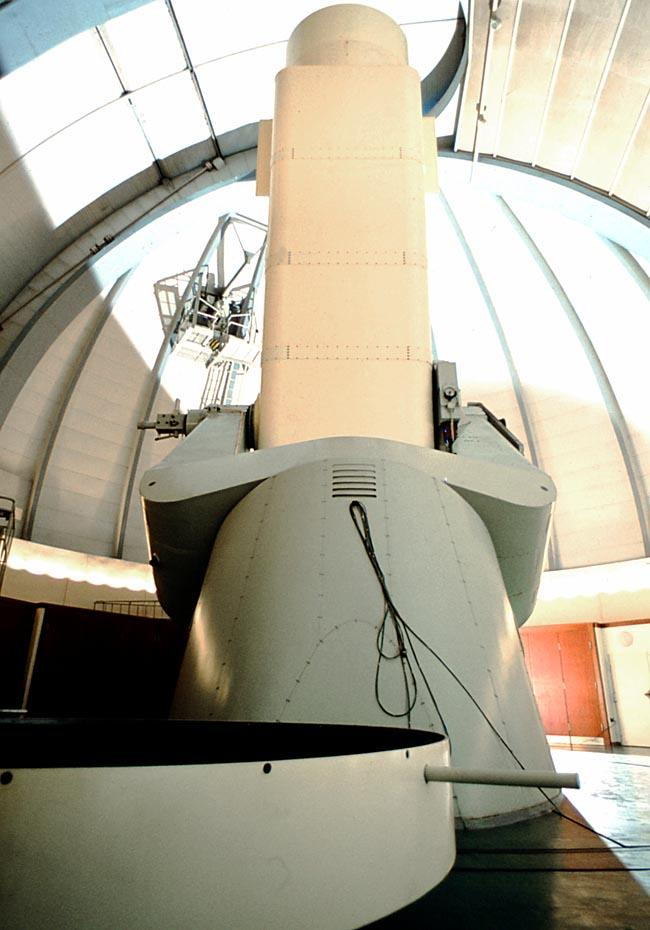
The 2m Schmidt Camera (the Alfred-Jensch Telescope at Karl Schwarzschild Observatory in Tautenburg, Germany).

Schmidt did not marry and had no children. Soon after his death, through the advocacy of Walter Baade when he arrived at the Mount Wilson Observatory in the United States, the Schmidt telescope idea took off. An 18" Schmidt was produced in 1936 and then twelve years later, the famous 48 in (120 cm) Samuel Oschin telescope Schmidt-telescope was built at Mount Palomar Observatory. This last telescope produced a flood of new observations and information.

Subsequently, at Bergedorf in 1955 a large, well-constructed Schmidt was dedicated. The 2-metre Schmidt telescope of the Karl Schwarzschild Observatory was built later and remains the largest Schmidt camera in the world, although more technologically advanced versions have since been produced. The Bergedorf Schmidt was moved to Calar Alto Observatory in 1976.

Schmidt is also the protagonist of the biographic novel Vastutuulelaev: Bernhard Schmidti romaan (Sailing Against the Wind : a Novel of Bernhard Schmidt) by Estonian author Jaan Kross.

Schmidt is the protagonist of Dominy Clements' opera An Enlightened Disciple of Darkness following his upbringing, life story, and legacy.

== See also ==
- List of astronomical instrument makers
- 1743 Schmidt
