= Kepler photometer =

Kepler's focal plane sensors

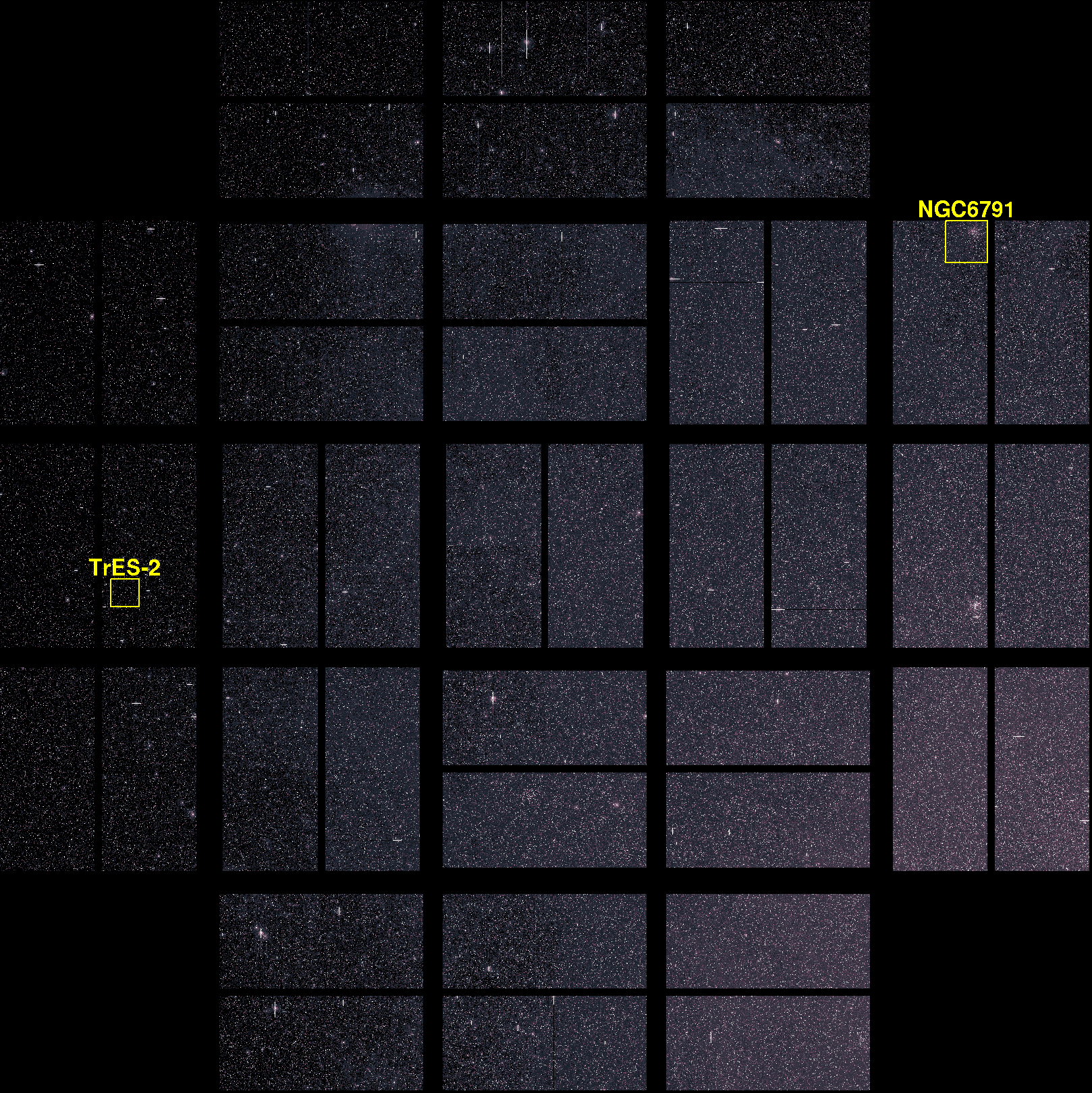
Kepler image with two points of interest outlined. Celestial north is towards the lower left corner.

The Kepler photometer is the main instrument on NASA's Kepler space telescope.

It is a Schmidt telescope (95 cm clear aperture, 140 cm mirror) with an array of 42 2200x1024 CCDs in the focal plane; each CCD is flat, but they are mounted on a curved structure to account for the curved focal plane. The CCDs are not abutting, so the focal plane is not entirely covered, but since the mission's goal is to observe a sample of stars, this doesn't matter.
