= Advent Video Beam Television =

The Advent VideoBeam was a type of projection television introduced around 1973 by Advent Corporation.

== Technology ==
The Advent VideoBeam television consists of two main parts: the base unit, which contains a projector, speakers, and tuner, and a curved screen, made of a reflective aluminium material. The screen is completely passive; both the image and sound originate from the base unit, and are reflected by the screen back towards the viewer.

The projection system of the VideoBeam uses three specially made cathode ray tubes, which individually project red, green, and blue. Like in normal CRTs, an electron beam is used to draw the image on a phosphor screen. However, in the VideoBeam, the phosphor screen is on a metal plate which faces inwards, with the resulting image shone backwards into the tube, reflected off a spherical mirror, and projected out the front of the tube through an acrylic lens. Overall, the internal optics are similar to that of a Schmidt telescope, and the resulting image has been noted to be brighter compared to other contemporary CRT projectors.

To lower the cost of the projector system, the focus distance and convergence are fixed. This also helped make the system easier to set up.

== Characteristics ==
- Advertised sale price: $2,500 around 1973, $3,000 in 1978
- 7-foot screen (51.5" x 68.5")
- 180 watts power consumption
- Focal distance fixed at 100"
- Projection technology: Cathode ray tube with rear-facing 3" phosphor screen and collimating mirror
- Clear, well-defined, and bright projected image
- Easy to install
