= Joseph Petzval =

Slovak physicist, mathematician and inventor

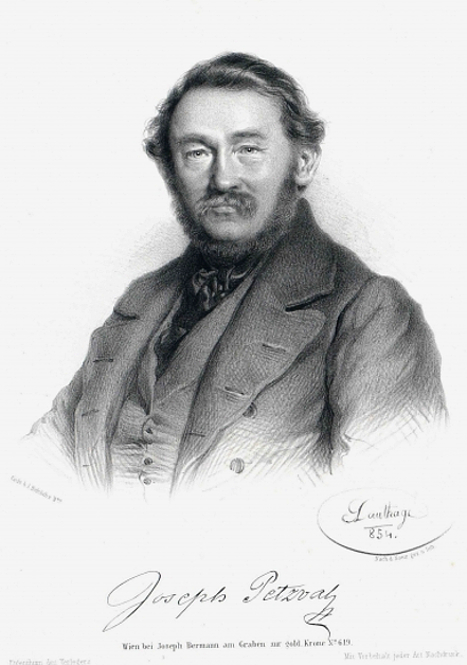
- Born: 6 January 1807; Szepesbéla/Zipser Bela, Kingdom of Hungary, Austrian Empire (today Spišská Belá, Slovakia)
- Died: 17 September 1891 (aged 84); Vienna, Austria-Hungary
- Citizenship: Kingdom of Hungary Hungarian
- Known for: Petzval field curvature Contributions to geometrical optics, photography, cinematography
- Scientific career
- Fields: Physics
- Workplaces: University of Budapest; University of Vienna

Joseph Petzval (6 January 1807 – 17 September 1891) was a mathematician, inventor, and physicist best known for his work in optics. He was born in the town of Szepesbéla in the Kingdom of Hungary (in German: Zipser Bela, now Spišská Belá in Slovakia).

Petzval studied and later lectured at the Institutum Geometricum (currently Budapest University of Technology and Economics) in Pest (today part of Budapest). He headed the Institute of Practical Geometry and Hydrology/Architecture between 1841 and 1848. Later in life, he accepted an appointment to a chair of mathematics at the University of Vienna. Petzval became a member of the Hungarian Academy of Sciences in 1873.

Petzval is considered to be one of the main founders of geometrical optics, modern photography and cinematography. Among his inventions are the Petzval portrait lens and opera glasses, both still in common use today. He is also credited with the discovery of the Laplace transform and is also known for his extensive work on aberration in optical systems.

== Early life ==
In 1801, Joseph Petzval's father married the Zipser German Susanne Kreutzmann, who was born in Szepesbéla, Kingdom of Hungary, a daughter of the previous teacher at the same school in Szepesbéla. The couple brought up six children: Gustáv Adolf (1800–1803), who died prematurely; Nestor Aemilianus (1804–1806); Joseph Maximilián (1807 - 1891); Otto Baltazár (1809–1883); and three daughters. In 1810, the family moved to Késmárk (in German: Käsmark, today Kežmarok, Slovakia) and in 1819 to Lőcse (in German: Leutschau, today Levoča, Slovakia).

The entire family shared an aptitude for technology. Joseph's father worked as a teacher at the evangelical school in Szepesbéla, as well as an organist in Szepesbéla and later in Késmárk. He was also a conductor and a geodesist in Lőcse. He had a reputation as an outstanding musician and composer, who was also gifted mechanically. In 1824, he was awarded two patents: one for improvements to the pendulum clock and the other for a "polygraph" (typewriter). Petzval's brother, Otto Baltazár Petzval, was a well-respected mathematician, engineer and astronomer.

=== Education ===
Joseph Petzval attended elementary school in Késmárk, and began his secondary school studies in Késmárk and Podolin (in German: Pudlein, now Podolínec, Slovakia). On 1 October 1819 he returned to his family in Lőcse, and entered high school. Both in elementary school and high school he ranked among the best in his class in the subjects of Latin (the official language of the Kingdom of Hungary) and religion; however, he struggled with his Hungarian. Before arriving at Lőcse, he was also very weak in mathematics. In Lőcse, however, he clearly improved in this discipline.

One anecdote told about Petzval is as follows: When his family had already decided to make a shoemaker out of Petzval, he read the book Analytic Paper on the Elements of Mathematics by the German mathematician Hauser over the summer holidays, just after completing his fourth class in elementary school. He was preparing to undergo a repeat class in mathematics. After Petzval finished the book, the child who had been a weak math pupil swiftly became a math genius.

After finishing high school, Petzval decided to move to the Institutum Geometricum, the engineering faculty of the Pester University. Before that, he had to complete a two-year lyceum, which he attended from 1823 to 1825 in Kassa (in German: Kaschau, today Košice, Slovakia). When he arrived there in 1823, Petzval was already well-versed in the subjects of Latin, mathematical analysis, classical literature and stylistics. In addition to his Slovak he was able to speak perfectly in Czech, German and Hungarian. With his father's assistance, he also learned French and English.

== Further studies and career ==
After completing the Lyceum, Petzval worked for a year as an educator for Count Almássy in the Heves county. In addition to bringing in some urgently needed money, this experience also provided him with important social contacts.

From 1826 to 1828, Petzval studied at the Institutum Geometricum in Pest, and earned an engineering diploma in 1828. In the same year, he joined the graduate degree program of the university, and became the self-appointed adjunct chair for the Physics Department (in 1831). From 1828 to 1835, Petzval simultaneously worked as an urban engineer for the city of Buda—particularly as a specialist in flood abatement and sewers—and studied mathematics, mechanics and practical geometry. He authored an unrealized plan to build a navigation channel around Buda. In 1830, his dam computations saved the city from an inundation caused by the flooding of the Danube. After he received his Ph.D. in 1832, he taught as an associate professor at the university. During this period, he also received a degree in mathematics. In 1835, he was appointed a university professor in higher mathematics.

After being invited to the University of Vienna in 1836, Petzval accepted a position of the chair of mathematics there in 1837, and worked until 1877 as a professor of mathematics. Apart from mathematics, he was also concerned with mechanics, ballistics, optics, and acoustics. His lectures on the theory of algebraic equations, which integrated linear and differential equations with constant and variable coefficients, ballistics, acoustic theory, and other areas were high quality and became well attended.

Petzval moved into a rented abandoned monastery at Kahlenberg mountain. He founded his own glass-sharpening workshop there. His lenses became world-famous because Petzval was also a skillful lens sharpener and precision mechanic.

In 1840, he designed his famous portrait lens. 1845 brought disputes with the entrepreneur Peter Wilhelm Friedrich von Voigtländer (1812–1878) over who had the right to produce Petzval's lenses. In 1859, Petzval's home was broken into, and his manuscripts — a result of many years of research — were destroyed. Petzval never managed to reconstruct the lost documents. His most refined technical book on optics, lost with his manuscripts, would never appear in print. From then on, he primarily concerned himself with acoustics and began to withdraw from society. His enterprise with Carl Dietzler failed in 1862 (see further below); Dietzler died in 1872.

In 1869, at the age of 62, Petzval married his housekeeper, but she died four years later. In 1877, he stopped lecturing, withdrew to a monastery on Kahlenberg, and became a hermit.

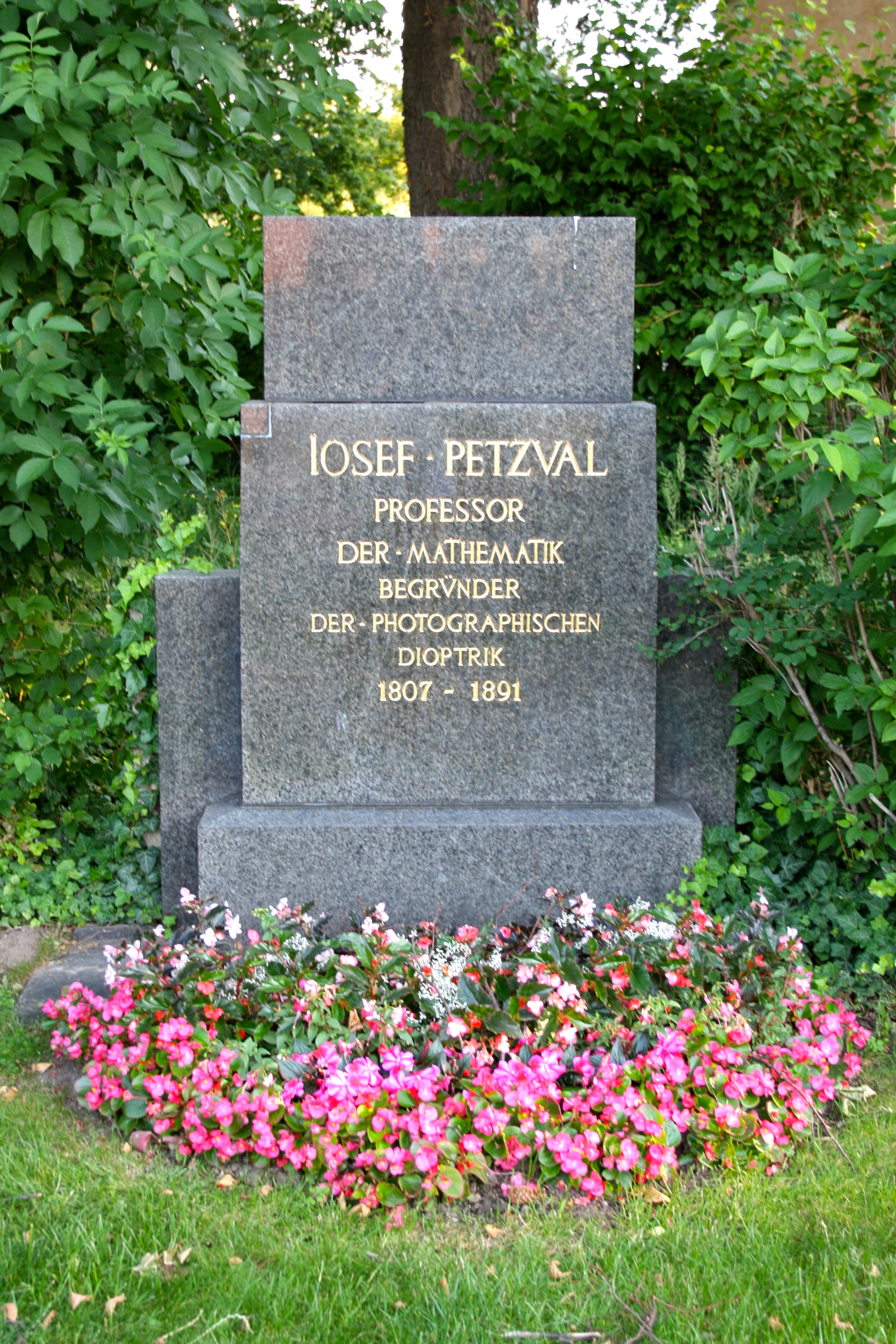
Joseph Petzval's grave

Petzval died in Vienna in 1891, nearly forgotten, embittered, and destitute. His grave is in the Viennese central cemetery. His bitterness at the end of his life can probably be traced, on the one hand, to his continuing controversy with Voigtländer, the loss of his manuscripts, and his business failure; and on the other hand, to the fact that he was never really acknowledged for his lifelong work in the field of optics. Just before his death, Petzval was reported to have said:

"I defeated the light, I have it firmly in hand, because there is much darkness in the world too."

=== Private life and hobbies ===
Petzval was a sportsman and a rider. As a young child, he often traveled with his family to the High Tatras. He was a recognized fencer and ring fighter in the city of Vienna. He inherited a talent for music from his father. Allegedly, while he was a lecturer in Vienna, he always rode to his lectures on a black Arabian horse.

Petzval did not share a lot about his private life, and was therefore relatively inscrutable to others during his lifetime. Dr. Ermenyi described in his book, Dr. Josef Petzval's Life

". . . he went so far as to always insert a bare point, for example, use the appearing annual yearbook of the Imperial Academy of Sciences, in whatever apart from the names of the members the date and the place appear aforementioned to the birth for itself into this column."

At the end of his life he lived in increasingly greater isolation in his "castle" on Kahlenberg, with only his horse for company, although several academies and scholarly societies appointed him a member (member of the Academy of Sciences in Vienna (1846/1849), external member of the Hungarian Academy of Sciences (1873), honorary member of the Union of the Czech mathematicians and physicists (1881), carriers of the French Charles Chevalier Platinmedaille, and others).

=== Disputes ===
Petzval placed very high requirements on himself and others. That was probably connected with his critical, contentious and sarcastic nature, which brought him many conflicts, particularly in the field of mathematics.

Petzval had a controversy with Christian Doppler over problems of acoustics, and Doppler responded in 1852 with a book entitled "Remarks Over the Objections Stated by Professor Petzval Against the Correctness of My Theory".

In particular he was involved in lengthy disputes with the entrepreneur Voigtländer. These began in 1845, when Petzval raised the issue of fraud for the first time. Because Petzval only held a patent in Austria, Voigtländer shifted his production to Braunschweig in Germany, where he produced about 60,000 Petzval lenses in the following 20 years. Petzval for his part co-operated since 1854 with the Austrian optics producer Dietzler. The latter's lenses were marketed in Austria as the "photographic Dialyt", while Voigtländer marketed the lenses in Germany and Austria as the "Voightländer Orthoskop". After further interference by Voigtländer, Dietzler went bankrupt in 1862. When Petzval threatened legal action, Voigtländer closed his Austrian plant in 1866. Petzval could have then transferred the marketing, but he had renounced working with optics after his home was robbed in 1859 and worked instead on acoustics. In 1862, he also stopped lecturing on optics.

== Discoveries and inventions ==
=== Optics ===
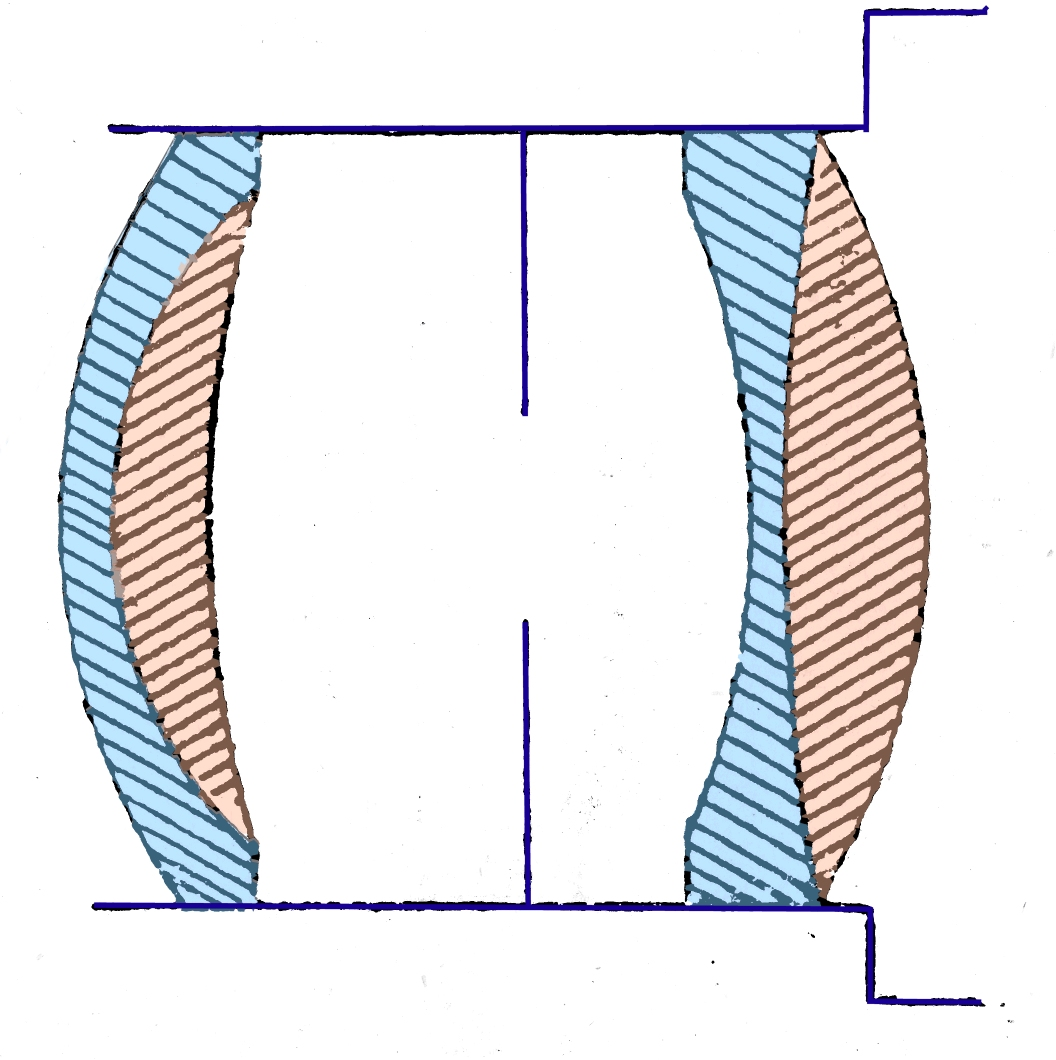
Diagram of Petzval's 1841 portrait lens - crown glass shaded pink, flint glass shaded blue

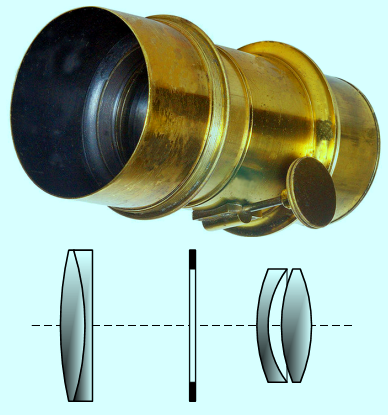
Petzval lenses

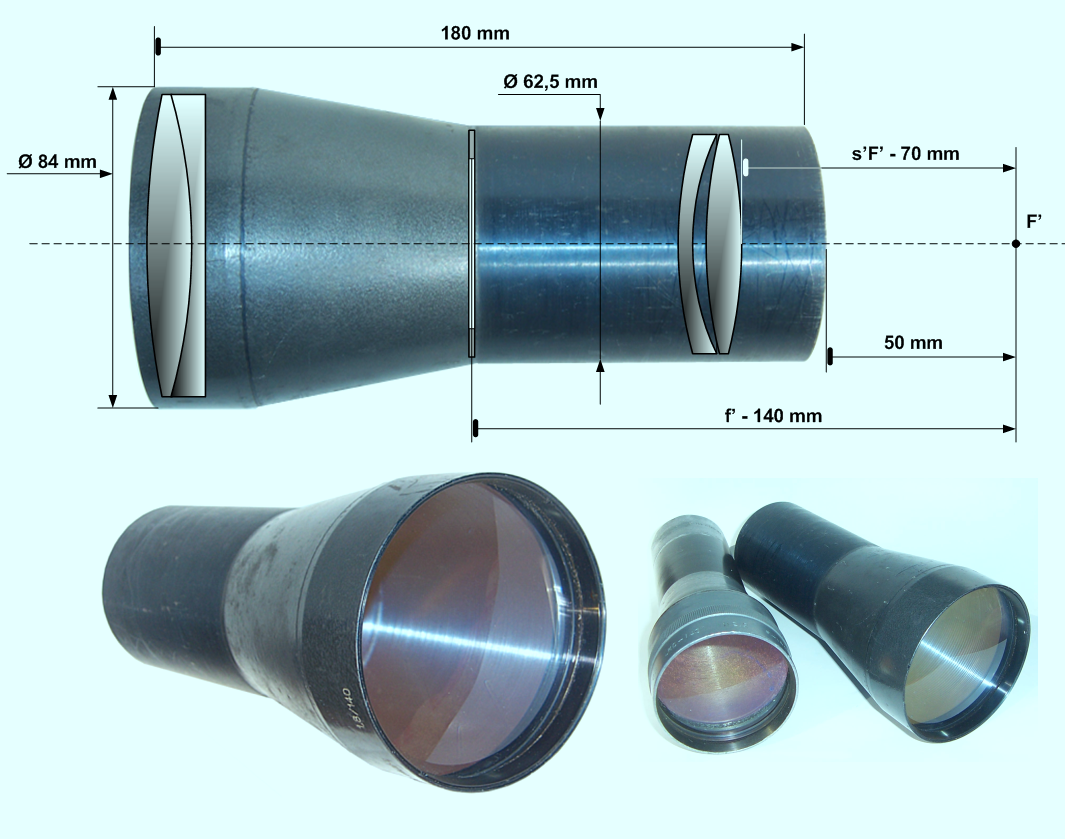
Modern Petzval objective lenses from a projector

Petzval's greatest achievements lie in his work with geometric optics. In 1839, Louis Daguerre presented the Daguerreotype, the first commercially successful photographic process. Fox Talbot's calotype was discovered earlier but did not enjoy commercial success. Petzval learned of the invention from his friend, Viennese professor Andreas von Ettingshausen. The daguerreotype was problematic in that it required exposure times as long as 30 minutes to create a portrait. With Ettingshausen's urging, Petzval set up a workshop and laboratory at Kahlenberg in Vienna and, after six months of complex computations, produced designs for improved objective lenses for both portraiture and landscape photography. Because the artillery was one of the few occupations that used advanced mathematical computations at the time, Archduke Ludwig lent eight artillery cannoneers and three corporals to the computational efforts. The calculations these men carried out in tandem with each other have been regarded as an early (albeit human) example of a parallel computer.

Petzval's portrait objective lens (Petzval Porträtobjektiv) was an almost distortionless Anachromatischer vierlinser (double achromatic objective lens, with four lenses in three groups). The luminous intensity of this flat "portrait lens" was substantially higher than the daguerre standard of 1839, the Wollaston Chevalier lens (f/16). The screen f/3.6 with a focal length of 160 mm made crucially shorter exposure times possible — using exposures of only about 15 to 30 seconds compared to the 10 minutes previously. Thus, snapshots became possible for the first time.

The portrait objective lens consisted of a cemented double lens in front (f/5) and a double lens with a gap in the back. The rear double lens was necessary for the correction of spherical and coma errors. The Chevalier lens used two cemented double lenses, but was immediately replaced by the Petzval lens, so that the Petzval Porträtlinse was the first cemented lens in widespread use. The first portrait objective lenses were rather small and had a diameter of 2.6 cm. The 1856 Petzval lenses produced by Dietzler had a diameter of 15 cm and a weight of 15 kg, with which one could make portraits measuring 33 by 42 cm.

In 1840, Petzval allowed the Viennese entrepreneur Peter Wilhelm Friedrich von Voigtländer to produce the lens for a one-time payment of 2,000 guldens, without a patent or a contract, which led later to a lasting controversy between Petzval and Voigtländer. Voigtländer, who had confirmed the process through his own calculations, produced a prototype in May 1840 and began production of the lens for the daguerreotype cameras in 1841, making a fortune in the process. The thermionic cameras were made from brass, using round daguerreotype plates which exposed a diameter of 8 cm. In 1841, 600 of these cameras were manufactured and sold at a price of 120 guldens. Voigtländer received a medal at the world exhibition in Paris for this achievement. These first metal-body cameras were prototypes of today's modern cameras. It took another 50 years until an improved camera became available. Petzval's portrait objective lens was used into the 1920s (often under other names) in cameras and is used today in projectors. The lens played an important role in the development of photography and cinematography.

Even with all its apparent improvements, Petzval was dissatisfied with the lens and, after some improvements, left it for others to produce and patent. The camera with the new landscape objective, produced by Dietzler, possessed a light foldable chamber with double bellows. Petzval never made a commercial profit from the lens.

Among Petzval's other works are the invention of opera glasses, lens system calculations that led to the perfection of a telescope and microscope (1843), computations for efficient binoculars, and construction of new floodlights (1847). His plan for the construction of lighting systems for ships on the Danube could not be carried out, however. His special mirror lamp (Petzval lamp), which made possible a maximum utilization of light energy, was used particularly for the bright projectors developed by Petzval. Petzval can also be regarded as the inventor of the modern unastigmatic lens system, based on records from his estate. Around 1860, Petzval conducted photogrammetric measurements using equipment he had designed. He also proved scientifically that glowing solid compounds emit more light than burning gases. Carl Freiherr Auer von Welsbach later applied this principle to the gas lamp he designed.

Petzval's achievements are used today in cinematography, astronomy, and meteorology. The Astro-Petzval-Objektiv lens is used in astronomy. This objective made a distortion-free illustration of a large part of the sky, as well as permitting photographing of galaxies and star fields. German optics companies (Töpfer, Voigtländerkorrigie, Zeiss) produced the Petzval objective lens until the 1940s. Petzval's largest contributions to optics are his theoretical bases for the construction and correction of optical lens systems. He carried out fundamental work for the theory of aberration in optical systems. A few central terms of this field were later named after Petzval:

- The Petzval surface is the generally curved image plane of an unadjusted optical system.
- In the case of adherence to the Petzval condition the Petzval surface is even.

To the regret of physicists, Petzval never released a prepared multi-volume optical work.

=== Mathematics ===
In mathematics, Petzval stressed practical applicability. He said, "Mankind does not exist for science's sake, but science should be used to improve the conditions of mankind." He worked on applications of the Laplace transformation. His work was very thorough, but not completely satisfying, since he could not use an edge integration in order to invert the transformation. Petzval wrote a paper in two volumes as well as a long work on this subject. A controversy with the student Simon Spritzer, who accused Petzval of plagiarism of Pierre-Simon Laplace, led the Spritzer-influenced mathematicians George Boole and Jules Henri Poincaré to later name the transformation after Laplace. Petzval tried to represent practically everything in his environment mathematically. Thus he tried to mathematically model fencing or the course of the horse. His obsession with mathematics finally led to the discovery of the portrait objective.

=== Acoustics ===
In the study of acoustics, Petzval was particularly concerned with string oscillations, differential equations of the string oscillations, and the mathematical theory of musical instruments. He designed a piano with three key sequences. Petzval developed a theory of the oscillations of strained strings as well as his own theory of tone systems.

== Memorials ==
The Jozef Maximilián Petzval Museum of the History of Photography and Cinematography, part of the Slovak Technical Museum of Košice, is located in Spišská Belá, in the house where Petzval was born. The crater Petzval on the far side of the Moon is named after him, as are roads and statues in modern Slovakia, Austria, and Hungary.

In 1980 a minor planet (3716 Petzval, 1980 TG) was named after Petzval upon the request of the astronomical institute in Tatranská Lomnica and Czech scientists; Petzval's portrait objective lens made possible the discovery of many asteroids at the end of the 19th century. The Austrian Board of Education has bestowed the "Petzval Medal" for special achievements in the area of scientific photography since 1928.

== Ethnicity and name ==
The Magyar Tudományos Akadémia Acta technica, Volume 25, 1959 notes a dispute over the ethnicity of Petzval. According to the Hungarian Academy of Sciences:

"The Austrians declared Petzval to having been an Austrian, the Czechs tried to prove his Bohemian origin, the Slovaks claiming to the fact that the County of Szepes, where Petzval was born, is now in Slovakia, so he must have been a Slovak."

— Hungarian Academy of Sciences,

The same publication also cites Petzval's expressed claim to being Hungarian and a "...loyal son of the fatherland" As mentioned earlier, he struggled with Hungarian language while at school, since it was not his mother tongue. Petzvals contemporaries widely accepted that he was Hungarian, as Petzval always proclaimed. "He lived 54 years of his life in Vienna, but could not become, and did not become a Viennese - devotedly to his native country, he remained a Hungarian." - told Lueger, mayor of Vienna, at Petzval's burial.

== Works ==
- Bericht über die Ergebnisse einiger dioptrischen Untersuchungen (Pest, 1843)
- Eigenschaften einer guten Camera-Obscura (Wien, 1847)
- Integration der linearen Differenzialgleichungen mit Constanten und veränderlichen Coefficienten, I–II. (Wien, 1853–1859)
- Berichte über optische Untersuchungen (Wien, 1857)
- Über das neue Landschaft – als Fernobjektiv (Wien, 1858)
- Theorie der Störungen der Stützlinien (bei Gewölben und Hängebrücken) (Leipzig, 1904–1905)
- Theorie der Tonsysteme (Leipzig, 1904–1905)
- Aus den Vorlesungen über Ballistik. Ein Beitr. zur Geschichte der Ballistik (Leipzig, 1908)
