= Schmidt–Cassegrain telescope =

Type of catadioptric telescope

Light path in a Schmidt–Cassegrain

The Schmidt–Cassegrain telescope (also abbreviated as SCT) is a catadioptric telescope that combines a Cassegrain reflector's optical path with a Schmidt corrector plate to make a compact astronomical instrument that uses simple spherical surfaces.

== Invention and design ==
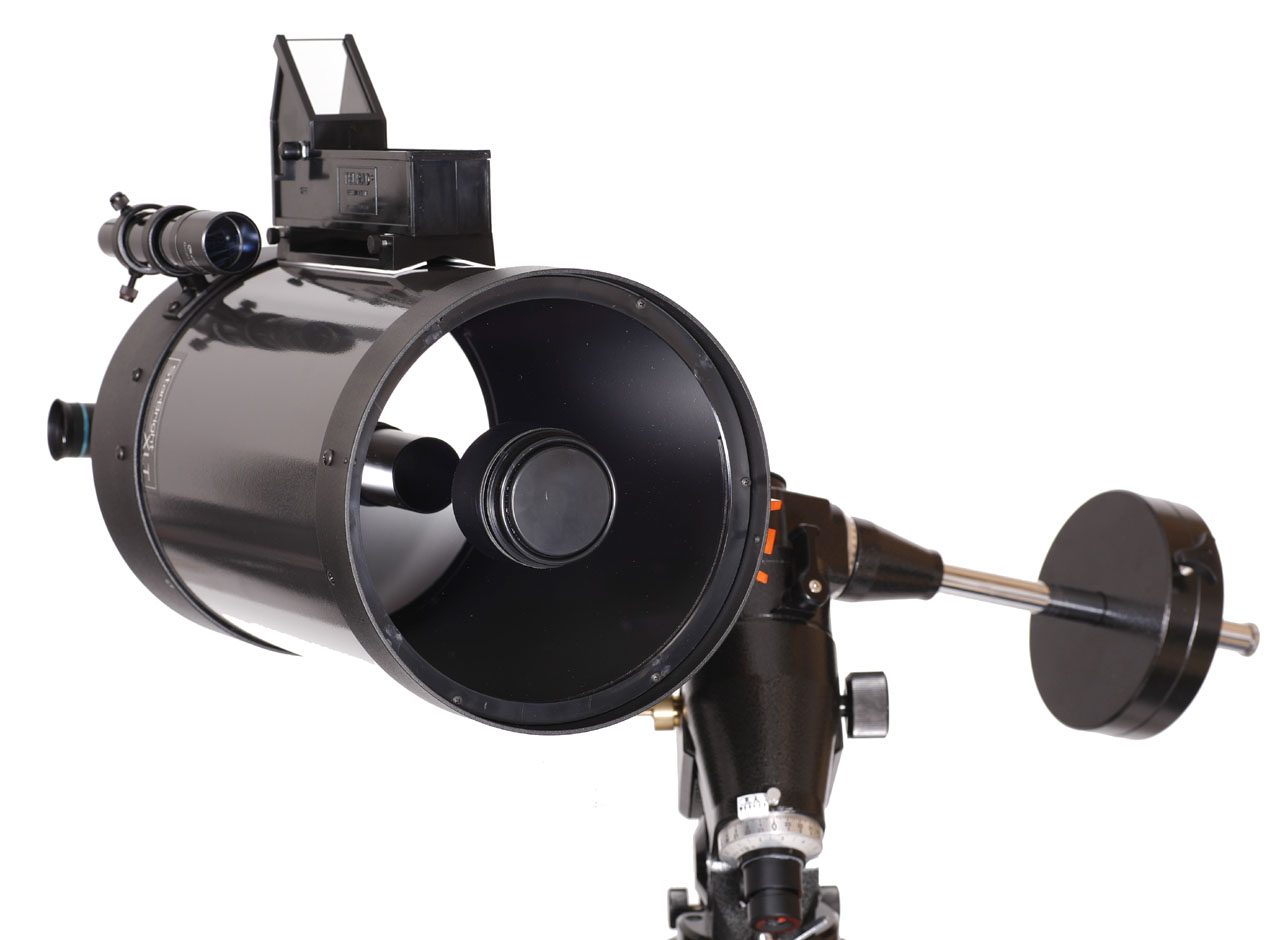
View of the corrector and primary mirror of a Schmidt–Cassegrain telescope.

The American astronomer and lens designer James Gilbert Baker first proposed a Cassegrain design for Bernhard Schmidt's Schmidt camera in 1940. The optical shop at Mount Wilson Observatory manufactured the first one during World War II as part of their research into optical designs for the military. As in the Schmidt camera, this design uses a spherical primary mirror and a Schmidt corrector plate to correct for spherical aberration. In this Cassegrain configuration the convex secondary mirror acts as a field flattener and relays the image through the perforated primary mirror to a final focal plane located behind the primary. Some designs include additional optical elements (such as field flatteners) near the focal plane. The first large telescope to use the design was the James Gregory Telescope of 1962 at the University of St Andrews.

As of 2021, the James Gregory Telescope is also recognized as the largest Schmidt-Cassegrain. The telescope is noted for its large field of view, up 60 times a full moon.

== Derivative designs ==
While there are many variations of the Schmidt–Cassegrain telescope design (both mirrors spherical, both mirrors aspherical, or one of each), they can be divided into two principal types: compact and non-compact. In the compact form, the corrector plate is located at or near the focus of the primary mirror. In the non-compact, the corrector plate remains at or near the center of curvature (twice the focal length) of the primary mirror.

Compact designs combine a fast primary mirror and a small, strongly curved secondary. This yields a very short tube length, at the expense of field curvature. Compact designs have a primary mirror with a focal ratio of around f/2 and a secondary with a focal ratio also around f/2, the separation of the two mirrors determining a typical system focal ratio around f/10.

One very well-corrected type of non-compact design is the concentric (or monocentric) Schmidt–Cassegrain, where all the mirror surfaces and the focal surface are concentric to a single point: the center of curvature of the primary. Optically, non-compact designs give better aberration correction and a flatter field than most compact designs, but at the expense of longer tube length.

== Amateur astronomical applications ==
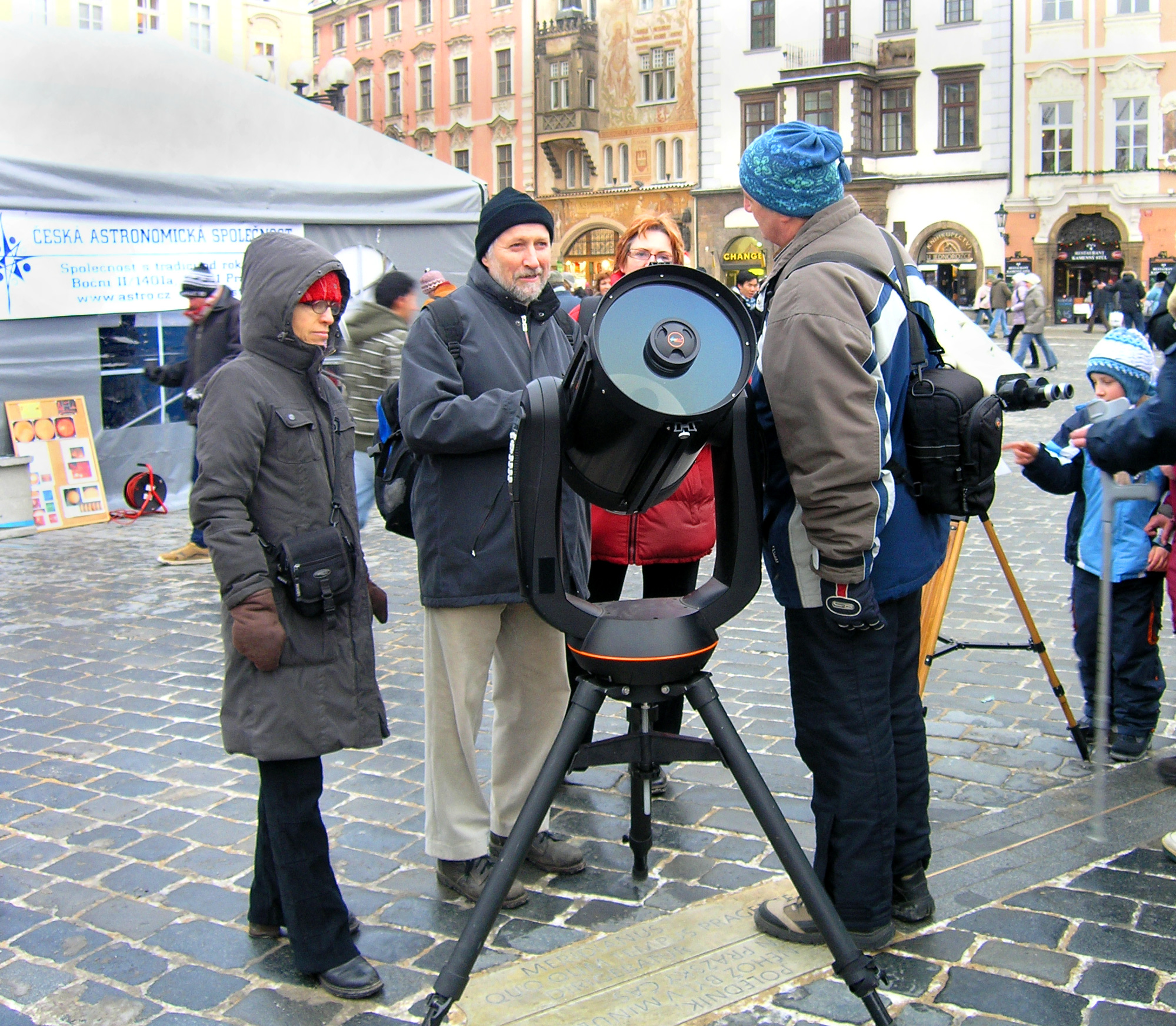
People demonstrating a Schmidt–Cassegrain telescope manufactured by Celestron at a sidewalk gathering

The Schmidt–Cassegrain design is very popular with consumer telescope manufacturers because it combines easy-to-manufacture spherical optical surfaces to create an instrument with the long focal length of a refracting telescope with the lower cost per aperture of a reflecting telescope. The compact design makes it very portable for its given aperture, which adds to its marketability. Their high f-ratio means they are not a wide-field telescope like their Schmidt camera predecessor, but they are good for more narrow-field deep sky and planetary viewing.

Consumer versions of this design typically achieve focus by adjusting the position of the primary mirror rather than a traditional eye-piece. This means that small changes in the position of the mirror are magnified by the focal length of the telescope. As the mirror is not permanently fixed in place, it is possible for it to move by a small amount and cause the image to shift. This is otherwise known as "mirror flop". Some Schmidt-Cassegrain telescopes are equipped with mirror locks to fix the primary mirror in place once focus has been achieved.

== See also ==
- Argunov–Cassegrain telescope
- Dobsonian telescope
- List of telescope types
- Maksutov telescope
- Newtonian telescope
- Ritchey–Chrétien telescope
- Schmidt camera
- Schmidt–Newtonian telescope
