= Field flattener lens =

Type of lens used in binoculars and astronomic telescopes

Field flattener lens is a type of lens used in modern binocular designs (Note: E.g. Canon 10 x 42 L IS WP, 18 x 50 IS All Weather and Swarovski EL 8.5 x 42, EL 10 x 42.) and in astronomic telescopes to improve edge sharpness. Field flattener lenses counteract the Petzval field curvature of an optical system, mitigating the field-angle dependence of the focal length of a system.

== Details ==
The object in designing a field flattening lens is to create a lens that shifts the focal points of the Petzval surface to lie in the same plane. Consider inserting a pane of glass in a focusing beam. Due to refraction, the focal point of the beam is shifted by $\delta_{x}$ dependent on the thickness of the glass. Thus we have a thickness as a function of focal shift:

$$t(\delta_{x})=\left(\frac{n}{n-1}\right)\delta_{x}$$.

$\delta_{x}(y)$ is given by the radius of curvature of the Petzval surface, $R_{p}$. It can be shown, then, that the radius of curvature for the lens that would flatten out the field is given by

$R_{f}=\left(\frac{n-1}{n}\right)R_{p}.$

== Examples of use ==
In the 21st century, the New Horizons spacecraft, which was an unmanned space probe sent past Pluto and the Kuiper belt, had a telescope instrument called the Long Range Reconnaissance Imager. LORRI was a reflecting telescope but incorporated a field-flattening lens, with three elements.

== See also ==
- Petzval field curvature
- Coma corrector
