= UMa Astronomy =

Public association based in Slovakia

- Formation: October 6, 2006
- Type: Non-profit organization
- Headquarters: Blahová
- Region served: Dunajská Streda District, Slovakia
- Field: Amateur astronomy, outreach, meteor observation
- Website: observatory.sk

UMa Astronomy is a Slovak public association based in Blahová, Dunajská Streda District, that focuses on astronomy, astronomical observations, and astrophotography. It was established to support amateur astronomy activities in the Žitný ostrov (Csallóköz) region. The association is named after the constellation Ursa Major.

== History ==
Founded in 2003, the organization was originally named AMADE and focused on environmental protection, culture, and education. Following the joining of several members from the CORVUS astronomical association, its statutes were amended, and the name was officially changed to UMa Astronomy on October 6, 2006.

== Activities and projects ==
The founding members and collaborators, including Tibor Csörgei, Štefan Kürti, Ivan Molnár, and Kristián Molnár, focus on the discovery of minor planets, observations of meteors and comets, and solar eclipse expeditions. In recognition of his work in amateur astronomy and for founding the association, minor planet (270472) was named "Csorgei" by the International Astronomical Union.

The association participates in international meteor observation programs and operates an official detection station (station code: SKUMA) for the International Meteor Organization. It operates the first public observatory in the Žitný ostrov region, which was named the Zsigmond Bödők Observatory in 2017 in honor of astronomer Zsigmond Bödők.

International collaborations include:

- CEMENT (Central European Meteor Network): Video meteor observation cooperation.
- Mount Everest Expedition (2010): Participation in an astronomical expedition to the Everest base camp.
- RMOB: Regular data contribution to the Radio Meteor Observing Bulletin.

== Instrumentation ==
The observatory is equipped with:

- Celestron C11 (Schmidt-Cassegrain) telescope on an NEQ6 mount, equipped with an ASI183 Pro camera.
- Sky-Watcher 355/1650 Dobson telescope with GoTo control.
- Sky-Watcher 102/1000 refractor.
- Four FHD cameras for video meteor observation.
- Radio meteor detection system (under renovation).

== Location ==
The Zsigmond Bödők Observatory is located in Blahová, Slovakia. 48°5′6″N 17°32′48″E
