= Suzhou Synta Optical Technology =

Chinese manufacturing company

- Industry: Manufacturing
- Founded: 1992
- Headquarters: Suzhou, Jiangsu, China

Suzhou Synta Optical Technology Co., Ltd. is a Chinese company located in Suzhou, Jiangsu, China, the primary manufacturing subsidiary of Synta Technology Corporation of Taiwan. It produces telescopes and astronomical equipment like mounts and eyepieces for the amateur astronomical market.

== Company history ==
The company was founded in 1988 as Synta Optics, at first producing only eyepieces. In 1992, the manufacturing was moved to Suzhou (Jiangsu) in China. Their first telescopes (4.5" (114 mm) -Newtonians) were distributed by Celestron and Tasco. In 1993, the first refracting telescopes were produced.

In 1999, the brand Sky-Watcher was established by Synta Taiwan to sell optics produced by Suzhou Synta. The head office was in Richmond, British Columbia, Canada. The brand is distributed in Canada and Europe and, in the late 2000s, extended to the U.S. market. Products produced by Suzhou Synta are also distributed under the Acuter name and via the Synta Taiwan owned subsidiary company Celestron. Suzhou Synta also used to manufacture products for Orion Telescopes & Binoculars.
