= Bushnell Corporation =

Manufacturer of optics and outdoor gear

- Type: Subsidiary
- Industry: Imaging
- Founded: 1948; 78 years ago, in California
- Founder: David P. Bushnell
- Headquarters: Overland Park, Kansas, United States
- Area served: worldwide
- Key people: Matt Reintjes, VP of Outdoor Products; Blake Lipham (CEO since November 2010)
- Products: Binoculars, telescopes, riflescopes, flashlights, GPS devices, holographic weapon sights, sunglasses, laser rangefinders, night-vision devices, speed guns, spotting scopes, trail cameras, Travel Tunes, WeatherFX
- Parent: Revelyst
- Subsidiaries: Browning Sports Optics; Simmons Outdoor Corporation; Tasco
- Website: Bushnell.com

Bushnell Corporation is an American firm that specializes in sporting optics and outdoor products. It is based in Overland Park, Kansas and is a wholly owned subsidiary of Revelyst. Bushnell makes binoculars, telescopes, spotting scopes, riflescopes, red dot sights, GPS devices, laser rangefinders, game cameras, night-vision devices, and other optical equipment.

== Company history ==
The company was founded in 1948 by David P. Bushnell, when he returned to California from his honeymoon in Japan with two crates of binoculars and sold them by mail order. Bushnell made precision binoculars affordable to middle-class Americans for the first time through a strategy of importing from manufacturers in Hong Kong, Taiwan, and Japan, who provided optics to his patented specifications. Bushnell eventually expanded his business to include riflescopes and spotting scopes. In 1971, Bushnell sold his company to Bausch & Lomb. The firm renamed itself Bushnell Performance Optics. Three years later, Bushnell retired as vice-president of Bausch & Lomb.

In 1999, Bausch & Lomb sold Bushnell Performance Optics to the private equity firm Wind Point Partners through a recapitalization of Bushnell's then parent company, Worldwide Sports & Recreation.

The Serengeti Eyewear brand was acquired by Bushnell in September 2000. Bollé, Cébé and Serengeti Eyewear were part of Vista Outdoor's acquisition of Bushnell in 2013. In July 2018, Vista Outdoor announced it had reached an agreement with a European private equity fund to sell the Bollé, Cébé and Serengeti eyewear brands.

In 2002, Bushnell bought the sporting optics company Tasco. Tasco is a major international distributor of telescopes. The company's line of products mainly target amateur astronomers but has grown to include many products besides telescopes. Tasco's other products include terrestrial spotting scopes, microscopes, binoculars, telescopic sights, and other rifle accessories. Tasco sells through specialty outlets, catalogs, and online vendors.

In 2005, Bushnell acquired Michael’s of Oregon. Michael's sold holsters, scope covers, cleaning kits, and other gun accessories under the brands Hoppe’s, Butler Creek, Stoney Point, and Uncle Mike’s Law Enforcement. The deal was closed with debt and cash.

In 2007, Bushnell was acquired by MidOcean Partners, another private equity firm, which acquired it in a leveraged recapitalization. The same year, Bushnell acquired the Final Approach and Kolpin Hunting brands from Facilitator Capital Funds, a Wisconsin-based private equity firm.

On Sept. 5, 2013, Alliant Techsystems announced that it had entered into a firm agreement to acquire Bushnell. ATK paid $985 million in cash, subject to customary post-closing adjustments.

After ATK merged with Orbital Sciences in 2015 to form Orbital ATK, it spun off Bushnell and other subsidiaries as Vista Outdoor, a publicly listed company.

In November 2024, Vista Outdoor separated its outdoor products business into an independent, publicly traded company named Revelyst. In January 2025, Revelyst was subsequently acquired by Strategic Value Partners.

== Brands ==
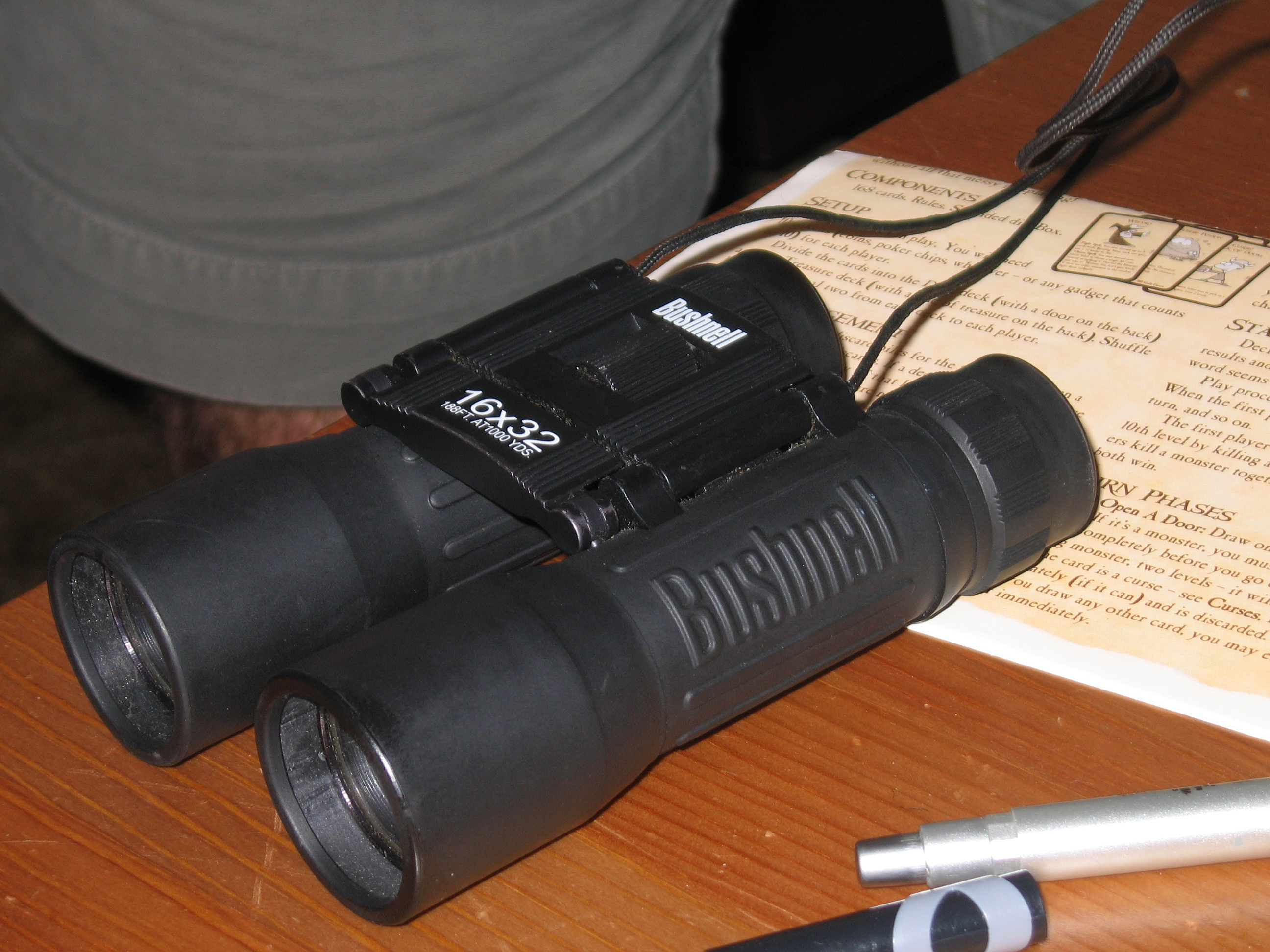
Bushnell binoculars

Bushnell is the parent company of these brands:

- Simmons Optics
- Millett
- Blackwater Gear
- Browning Sports Optics
- Bushnell Golf
- Butler Creek
- Hoppe’s
- Simmons Outdoor Corporation
- Stoney Point
- Tasco
- Uncle Mike’s

== Products ==
=== Optics ===
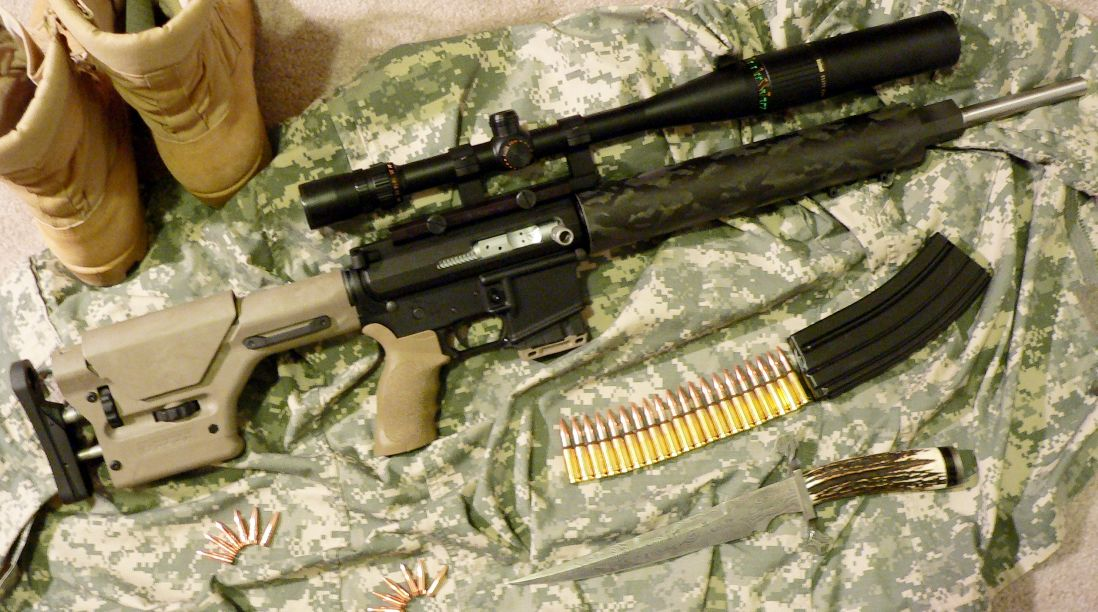
Grendel counter-sniper rifle with Bushnell Elite 4200 scope

- Riflescopes: Bushnell makes a variety of scopes, most famously the "Elite", "Trophy" and "Legend" lines. They won an Editor's Choice award in 2007 for their Elite 4200 6-24x40 scope from Outdoor Life magazine. Their current line mainly consists of the "Banner", "Forge", "Elite Tactical", "Engage", "Nitro", "Prime", "TAC" series, as well as the previous "Trophy", "AR" and "AK" series.
- Binoculars: Bushnell sells a wide variety of binoculars and was awarded the Best Buy award from Outdoor Life magazine in 2005 for their Browning Sports Optics binoculars and in 2006 for their Legend binoculars.
- Microscopes
- Telescopes: Bushnell made smaller amateur optical telescopes. Some popular models include the "ARES 5", and the "Voyager" series. Some of the telescopes they sold were direct copies of other models too.
- Spotting scopes for target shooting, hunting and birdwatching
- Game cameras
- Night vision devices: Bushnell won an OpticsPlanet Brilliance award in 2017 for its night vision products.
- Radar guns for sporting use
- Simmons Optics, a line of rifle scopes, binoculars, and other optical products.

Under license from EOTech, Bushnell also sells Holosight, a polymer-cased non-magnifying holographic weapon sight that generates an illuminated virtual crosshair that appears to be floating in front of the gun in perfect alignment.

Bushnell introduced the AR Optics 1-4 scope in 2018. It has a 30mm tube and has an objective lens diameter of 24mm. It has caliber-specific reticles that are illuminated for use in low-light. The AR Optics 1-4 is intended for use with modern sporting rifles.

=== Outdoor ===
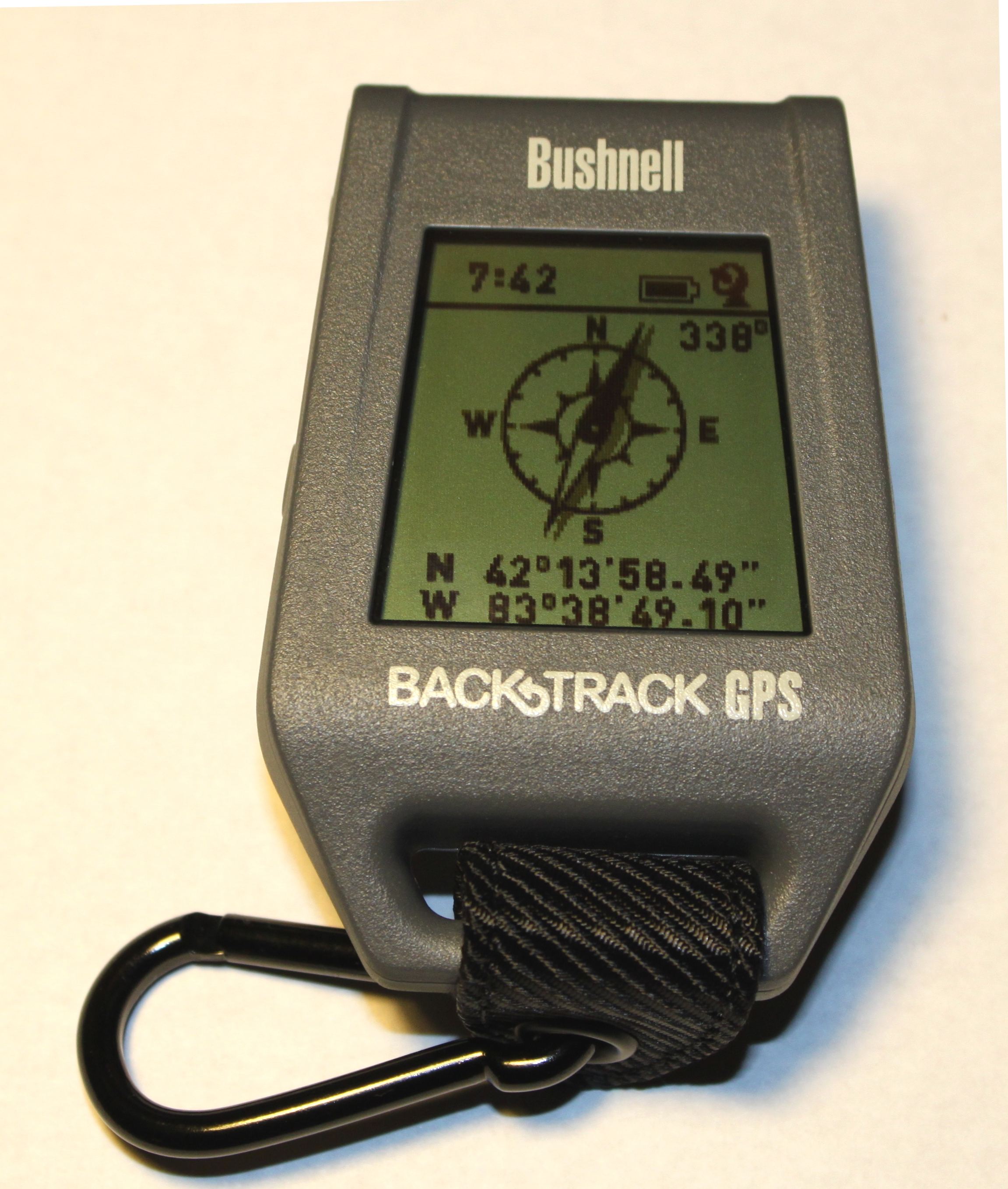
Bushnell Point 5 GPS device

Bushnell produces WeatherFX personal weather stations for hikers, campers, and others who can use it to keep informed of potentially hazardous weather issues while away from home.

Bushnell created two GPS products in 2006 that are the first such devices to integrate aerial and satellite imagery into the display. They also have integrated XM radio to provide real-time weather data and can overlay weather maps and weather radar info. In 2007 the Onix 400 GPS unit won the "Best of the Best" award from Field & Stream magazine.

Bushnell also has a line of simple GPS devices called Backtrack. They allow users to set up to five locations (depending on the model) and forget about the device until they have to return. The device then uses a digital compass and basic GPS technology to guide users back to the set location.

Bushnell sells SolarWrap and SolarBook solar-cell charging stations for small electronic devices. The SolarWrap wraps around a battery like a scroll when in storage and is unrolled when in use. The SolarBook flips out like the page of an open book.

=== Radar guns ===
Bushnell Speedster radar guns are designed for athletes, coaches, trainers, etc. to track speed with an accuracy of ±1 mph (1.6 km/h) within a range of 1,500 ft (460 m).

=== Golf rangefinders ===
In 2019, Bushnell released the Pro XE laser rangefinder. The Pro Xe is accurate to within one yard from a distance of 500 yards. The Pro Xe also includes an adjustment system to take into account the slope of the course; the unit even takes into account differences in air pressure due to altitude and other elements such as temperature to improve accuracy. The Pro Xe's optics offer 7x magnification. The Pro Xe is also equipped with magnets so it can be placed any metal portion of a golf cart.

=== Magazine loaders ===
Bushnell released an electric magazine loader under its Butler Creek brand in 2018. The ASAP Electronic Magazine Loader automatically positions loose ammunition and feeds it into magazines. The magazine loader's hopper can accept 60 rounds at a time. Users select how many rounds they want to be loaded and the press a button to start the process of loading an attached magazine. Bushnell also offers manual magazine loaders under the Butler Creek brand.
