= David Bushnell =

David Bushnell may refer to:

- David Bushnell (inventor) (1740 – 1824), American inventor, inventor of the Turtle submersible
- David Bushnell (historian) (1923 – 2010), American historian
- David P. Bushnell (1913 – 2005), American entrepreneur, founder of Bushnell Corporation
