= Synta Technology Corporation of Taiwan =

Taiwanese telescope and optics manufacturer

Synta Technology Corporation of Taiwan (Synta Taiwan), also known as Synta, is a manufacturer of telescopes and optical components headquartered in Taoyuan, Taiwan. Synta currently manufactures products for Acuter, Celestron, Saxon, and Sky-Watcher, and formerly for Orion Telescopes & Binoculars.

== History ==
Synta Technology Corporation was founded in Taoyuan, Taiwan around 1980 by mechanical and optical designer Dazhong Shen, (a/k/a David Shen). In 1992 Synta, along with Canadian investors, established the Suzhou Synta Optical Technology Co., Ltd in Suzhou (Jiangsu), China (outside Shanghai) as a manufacturing facility producing telescopes for Celestron and Tasco. In 1999 Synta established the brand Sky-Watcher, with head offices in Richmond, British Columbia, to distribute products in Canada and Europe, and in the late 2000s, to the USA market. In 2005 Synta purchased the struggling US-based Celestron, continuing its manufacture of Celestron products and running the US facilities through SW Technology Corporation; Synta's Delaware-based holding company. Synta also distributes under the Acuter name and manufactured products for the now-defunct Orion Telescopes & Binoculars.
