= Orion Telescopes & Binoculars =

American retail company

- Type: Private
- Industry: Optical instruments
- Founded: 1975
- Founder: Tim Gieseler
- Defunct: 2024
- Headquarters: Watsonville and Cupertino, California, United States
- Number of locations: 2
- Products: Telescopes; binoculars; accessories
- Website: telescope.com

Orion Telescopes & Binoculars was an American retail company that sold telescopes, binoculars and accessories online and in-store for astronomy and birdwatching. It was founded in 1975 and had corporate offices in Watsonville, California. A large proportion of its products were manufactured by the Chinese company Synta for the Orion brand name. Orion Telescopes & Binoculars shipped its products to the United States and over 20 other countries. Orion put out a semi-quarterly mail-order catalog as well as email catalogs. The company was a prominent advertiser in North American astronomy magazines, such as Sky & Telescope and Astronomy.

In July 2024, Sky & Telescope magazine reported that Optronic Technologies, the owner of Orion Telescopes, had closed their facilities in California and had laid off all of their employees. As of July 15, there had been no official announcement from the company, and S&T said they were trying to get more information from their sources.

== History ==
In 1975, Orion Telescopes & Binoculars was founded in a garage in Santa Cruz, California by Tim Gieseler, who served as its only president and CEO.

Between the mid-1990s and 2005, Orion only sold binoculars, telescopes, and accessories under the "Orion" brand.

In January 2005, Orion was acquired by Imaginova, the U.S. conglomerate founded in 1999 by CNN business anchor Lou Dobbs. Orion then began to sell non-Orion brand products, such as Tele Vue eyepieces and even Celestron 8-inch (200 mm) and 11-inch (280 mm) Schmidt-Cassegrain telescopes.

In June 2021, Orion acquired Meade Instruments.

== Products ==
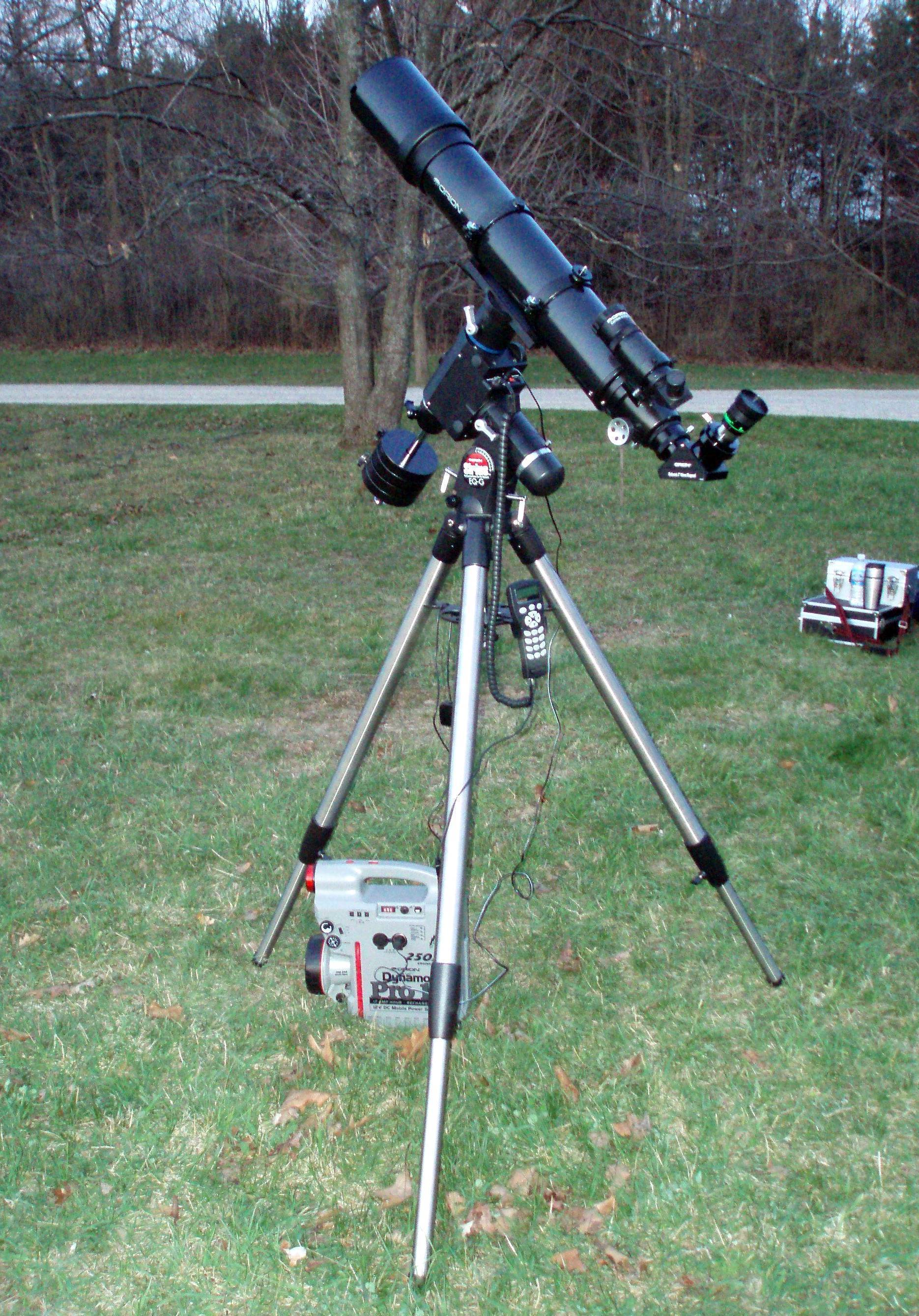
Orion ED120 apo refractor on Orion's Sirius EQ-G "GoTo" and GPS equipped German equatorial mount with portable 12 volt power supply

Orion sold a range of telescopes that they characterize as "beginner", "intermediate" or "advanced", including Newtonians, Maksutovs, Schmidt-Cassegrains, Ritchey-Chrétiens and refractors with or without (sold as optical tube assemblies or "OTA") a variety of mounts. Orion also sold a series of Dobsonian telescopes that come in "Classic" and "IntelliScope" versions, the latter with upgraded accessories and the ability to indicate astronomical objects to the observer aided by a computerized object database. Orion also sold Dobsonians with GoTo and tracking capabilities.

In late 2005 Celestron (which had recently been purchased by Synta Technology Corporation of Taiwan) announced an agreement that would allow Celestron 8, 9.25, and 11-inch (280 mm) Schmidt-Cassegrain optical tube assemblies (OTA), painted in metallic gray and using the "Orion" brand (Celestron OTAs are painted either gloss black or semi-gloss matte orange), to be sold with Orion branded German equatorial mounts (also made by Synta) and eyepiece accessories.

At the high performance end of their range, Orion had a series of two element apochromatic (apo) refractors manufactured by Synta featuring "extra low dispersion" fluorite crown glass in one element of the objective lens. These are marketed as the ED80 (80 mm or 3-inch (76 mm) objective at f/7.5), ED100 (100mm or 4-inch (100 mm) at f/9) and ED120 (120mm or 4.7-inch (120 mm) at f/7.5).

Orion also sold binoculars for astronomical and terrestrial observing, microscopes and monocular spotting scopes of the type used by birdwatchers and marksmen.
