= Bollé (company) =

Eyewear and head protection designer

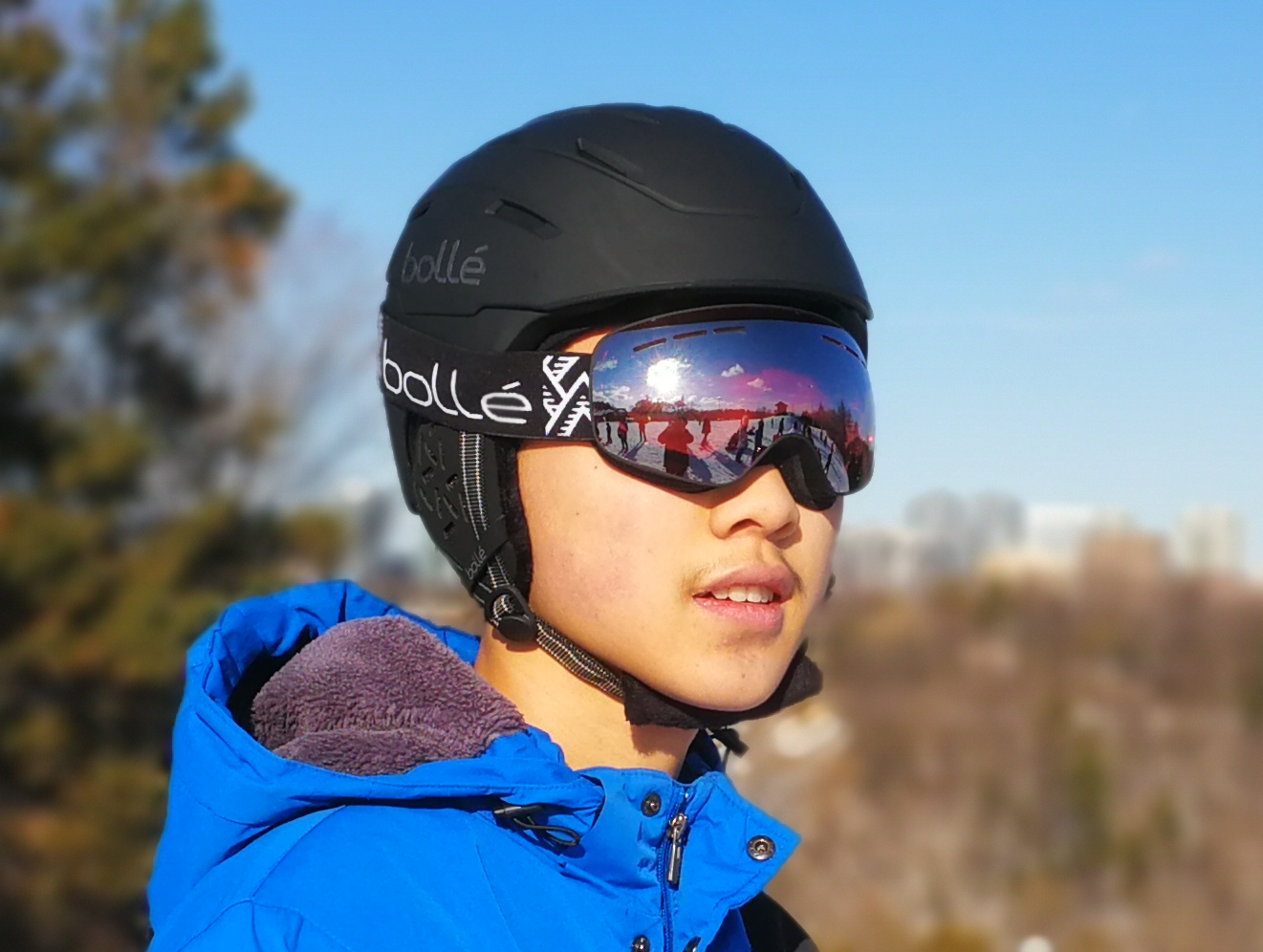
- A skier wearing Bollé goggles and a Bollé helmet
- Type: Société par actions simplifiée
- Industry: Eyewear
- Founded: 1888; 138 years ago (current structure since June 9, 1997 )
- Founder: Séraphin Bollé
- Headquarters: Villeurbanne, France
- Area served: Worldwide
- Products: Sunglasses, ski masks, ski helmets and bicycle helmets
- Number of employees: 292 (2024)
- Parent: Bollé Brands
- Website: www.bolle.com

Bollé is a French eyewear and head protection brand that designs, markets and distributes sunglasses, safety glasses, goggles and ski and bicycle helmets. It is part of Bollé Brands, which also owns the brands Bollé Safety, Cébé, H2Optix, Spy Optic and Serengeti . It is headquartered in Lyon, France.

== History ==
The Bollé was established in 1888 by Seraphim Bollé in Oyonnax, France. In 1925, the Bollé company first used celluloid glasses as part of its production. In 1936, the company expanded its sales to the UK trading as Thurgar-Bollé.

After the Second World War, Bollé used molded nylon in the manufacturing process with sunglasses featuring protective lenses. The first pair of safety goggles and masks were added to the Bollé range of products in 1950. Six years later, Georges Bollé created the nylon "cat-eye" sunglass and the first cycling specific sunglasses, the Nylon Grand Sport. In 1960, ski goggles were first marketed by Bollé.

Throughout the 1970s, Bollé continued to invest in and develop protective eyewear, eventually moving into PPE eyewear for industrial work environments.

=== Acquisition by Bushnell ===
In 2001, Bushnell acquired the Bollé and Serengeti Eyewear brands. Bollé, Cébé and Serengeti were part of Vista Outdoor’s acquisition of Bushnell in 2013. A&M Capital Europe, a London-based middle-market private equity firm, acquired Bollé Brands from Vista Outdoor Inc. (“Vista”) in 2018. AMCE appointed a new management team headed by Peter Smith as President & CEO of Bollé Brands. AMCE created the holding company Bollé Brands to bring the Bollé business units under the same umbrella.

Following this acquisition Bollé Brands moved its US corporate headquarters into Spy's California headquarters and now runs its US operations out of Carlsbad.
