= Serengeti Eyewear =

Brand of sunglasses

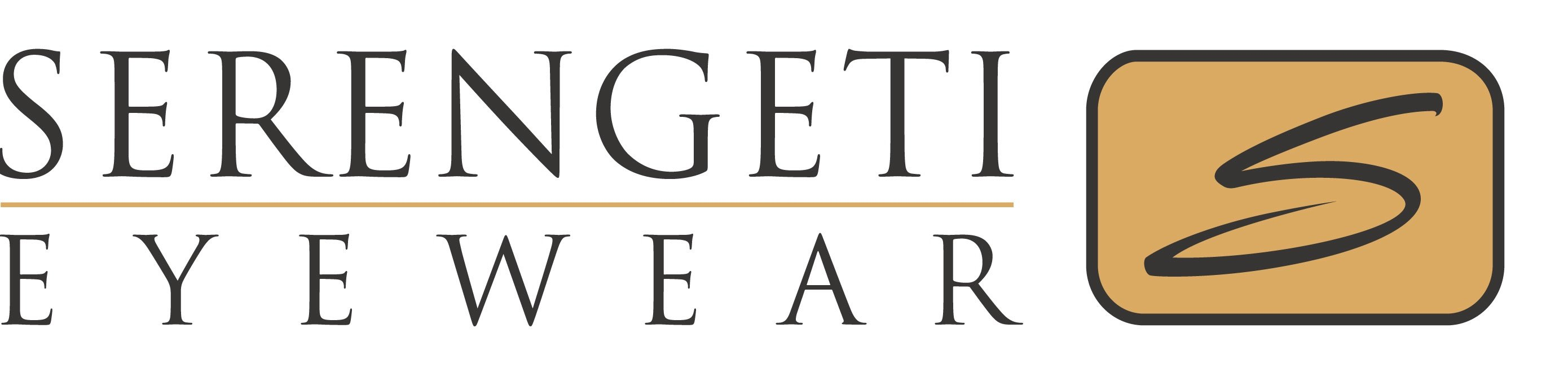
- Type: Subsidiary
- Founded: 1983
- Founder: Corning Incorporated
- Headquarters: 9200 Cody, Overland Park, Kansas, United States
- Key people: Zaki Mustafa
- Products: Eyewear and sunglasses
- Owner: Bollé Brands
- Number of employees: 52
- Website: www.serengeti-eyewear.com/us/

Serengeti Eyewear is a sunglasses line owned by Bollé Brands. Their main focus is eye protection; the company researches and develops technology such as photochromic lenses, polarized lenses, spectral control, among others.

== History ==
The brand was developed by Corning Incorporated. In 1984, Corning considered closing Serengeti due to poor financial performance. However, entrepreneur Zaki Mustafa convinced the board that he could save the brand. He attributed poor sales to a product-centric focus, poor marketing, anemic customer service, and inefficient asset management. With only fifty-two employees, he successfully increased sales from $5 million in 1985 to $62 million in 1992.

== Technology and design ==
Serengeti sunglasses include tinted photochromic and polarized lenses.

Tucker Viemeister designed aviator style sunglasses in sepia tones for Serengeti in the 1980s.

== Acquisition ==
The Serengeti brand was acquired by Bushnell Corporation in September 2000. Bollé, Cébé and Serengeti were part of Vista Outdoor's acquisition of Bushnell in 2013. In July 2018, Vista Outdoors announced it had reached an agreement with a European private equity fund to sell the Bollé, Cébé and Serengeti eyewear brands.

== See also ==
- Blenders Eyewear
