= Tom Johnson (astronomer) =

American astronomer

Thomas Jasper Johnson or Tom Johnson (January 11, 1923 – March 13, 2012) was an American electronics engineer and astronomer who founded Celestron, a company which manufacturers telescopes, which revolutionized the amateur astronomy industry and hobby. Sky & Telescope magazine has called him "among the most important figures shaping the last half century of amateur astronomy."

Johnson was born in 1923. He served as a military radar technician during World War II.

In 1955, Johnson, an engineer, established Valor Electronics, which produced electronics for military and industrial use. Valor, which was headquartered in Gardena, California, had more than one hundred employees by the early 1960s.

Johnson, who had a strong interest in amateur astronomy, originally created Celestron as the "Astro-Optical" division of Valor Electronics in 1960. Around 1960, Johnson had been looking for a telescope which could be used by his two sons, but found no child-friendly models on the market at the time. Johnson built a new telescope, a 6-inch reflector telescope, by himself, in 1960. He was visiting his brother in Costa Mesa, California when he came upon his nephew, Roger, trying to grind the 6 inch diameter lens he purchased from the clearance table at a local hobby shop. Roger was tired of the project and offered the lens-grinding kit to his uncle. Thomas Jasper took the kit home and after several days of hand grinding, he invented a machine that would grind the lens for him. Thus, by accepting the lens grinding kit from his nephew, Roger L. Johnson, "TJ" (as the family called him) created that first lens of many.

On July 28, 1962, he publicly unveiled a new invention, a portable 18 3/4-inch Cassegrain telescope, at the party held by the Los Angeles Astronomical Society on Mount Pinos. The new transportable telescope proved so groundbreaking that Johnson's invention was featured on the cover of a 1963 issue of Sky & Telescope.

Johnson's interest in telescopes soon became a full-fledged business. Johnson's new company, Celestron, which descended from the "Astro-Optical" division of Valor Electronics, soon began selling more sophisticated Schmidt–Cassegrain telescopes in models ranging from just 4 inches to 22 inches. However, the Schmidt–Cassegrain telescope proved difficult to mass-produce because the models needed Schmidt corrector plate, an advanced aspheric lens, which could be hard to manufacture. To solve this production problem, Johnson and the company's engineers invented a new type of telescope, the Celestron 8, in 1970. The Celestron 8 was more compact, affordable and easier to manufacture than traditional telescopes, like the Schmidt–Cassegrain. Johnson's new telescope proved very popular in the amateur astronomy and educational industries, allowing the hobby to rapidly expand and reach more consumers.

Johnson sold Celestron in 1980.

Johnson was awarded the David Richardson Medal from the Optical Society of America in 1978, the Bruce Blair Medal from the Western Amateur Astronomers in 1993, and the Lifetime Achievement Award by the Small Telescope & Astronomical Society in 2009.

Tom Johnson died at 5 a.m. PST on March 13, 2012, at the age of 89.
