= David P. Bushnell =

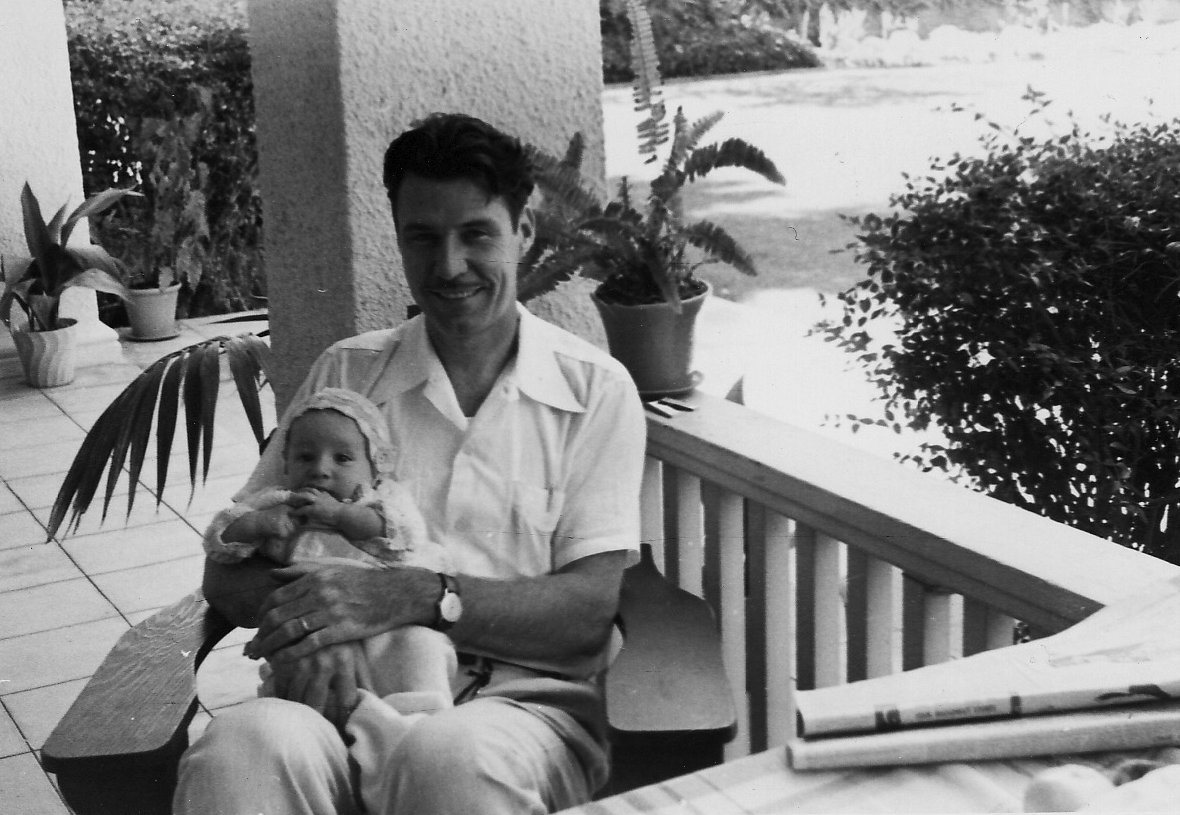
- Bushnell in late 1949 in Pasadena, holding a child.
- Born: David Pearsall Bushnell; March 31, 1913; Saint Paul, Minnesota
- Died: March 24, 2005 (aged 91); Laguna Beach, California
- Known for: Founder of Bushnell optics company

David Pearsall Bushnell (1913–2005) was an American entrepreneur who founded the Bushnell optics company in 1948. Bushnell made precision binoculars affordable to middle-class Americans for the first time through a strategy of importing from manufacturers who provided optics to his patented specifications.

== Early life and education ==
Bushnell was born in Saint Paul, Minnesota, on March 31, 1913, and raised in Los Angeles, California. From 1930 to 1933, he studied engineering at California Institute of Technology, paying for his tuition by selling newspapers. He then dropped out to travel around the world. Bushnell returned after 8 months and attended the University of Southern California where he earned an undergraduate degree in foreign trade in 1936.

Bushnell was related to David Bushnell, designer of The Turtle, a Revolutionary War submarine.

== Career ==
After graduation, Bushnell began an import-export business, which included importing Belgian cement and Iranian bracelets, and exporting asbestos and old Salvation Army shoes to China. During World War II, Bushnell worked for Lockheed in administration. In 1948, on an extended honeymoon with his second wife who was also in foreign trade, he bought some binoculars in Japan. When he and his wife returned to California, his success selling 400 pair in otherwise awkward circumstances put him in the optical business. Bushnell Optical was soon founded. Binoculars were soon joined by riflescopes and various other optical equipment such as spotting scopes and telescopes. Bushnell Optical was granted patents for numerous inventions that made its products lighter and more precise. Bushnell Optical later moved on to working with factories in Hong Kong, Taiwan, and Japan. Half of a pair of Bushnell Custom Compact binoculars served as part of the backup navigation system in a Gemini space flight.

Bushnell sold his company to Bausch & Lomb (B&L) in 1971 and retired in 1974 as a vice-president of B&L. The company was renamed to Bushnell Performance Optics by B&L.

== Family and death ==
In 2005, Bushnell died of non-Hodgkin's lymphoma at his home in Laguna Beach, California, a week before his 92nd birthday. Bushnell's first wife, Frances Elizabeth Krug, died in 1947. His second marriage, to Nina Gmirkin, ended in divorce. Bushnell was survived by his third wife, Nancy. He had two sons, David Alan Bushnell and Steven Ensign Bushnell, and two daughters, Natasha Bushnell Suter and Jean Bushnell Salfen.
