= Sky-Watcher =

Astronomical company

- The logo of Sky-Watcher, featuring a galaxy similar to Messier 51
- Type: Corporation
- Industry: Optical instruments; technology
- Founded: 1999; 27 years ago
- Headquarters: Suzhou, China
- Products: Telescopes; mounts
- Number of employees: 50
- Website: https://www.skywatcher.com

Sky-Watcher is a commercial distribution company established in 1999 by the Taiwanese astronomical optics manufacturer Synta. It markets and sells astronomy equipment including telescopes, mounts and eyepieces, and is aimed at the amateur astronomy market. The products are manufactured at Synta Taiwan's Suzhou Synta Optical Technology Co., Ltd. in Suzhou, China. The brand is distributed in Canada, Europe and in the late 2000s, it was extended to the United States market.

== Company history ==
In 1999, the Sky-Watcher brand was established to sell Synta Taiwan's optics, with head offices in Richmond, British Columbia, Canada. They began producing Dobsonian telescopes in 2000, followed by Maksutov–Cassegrains in 2001, and Apochromat ED-APO refracting telescopes in 2004.

Sky-Watcher sells telescopes from 2" (50mm) up to 20" (508mm) aperture with manual, motor-driven, or GoTo mounts. Since 2008, Sky-Watcher has manufactured Dobsonians with collapsible tubes, a product line they call Flex Tube-Dobsonians.

== Products ==
Sky-Watcher products include telescopes, spotting scopes, mounts, and other accessories.

== Gallery ==
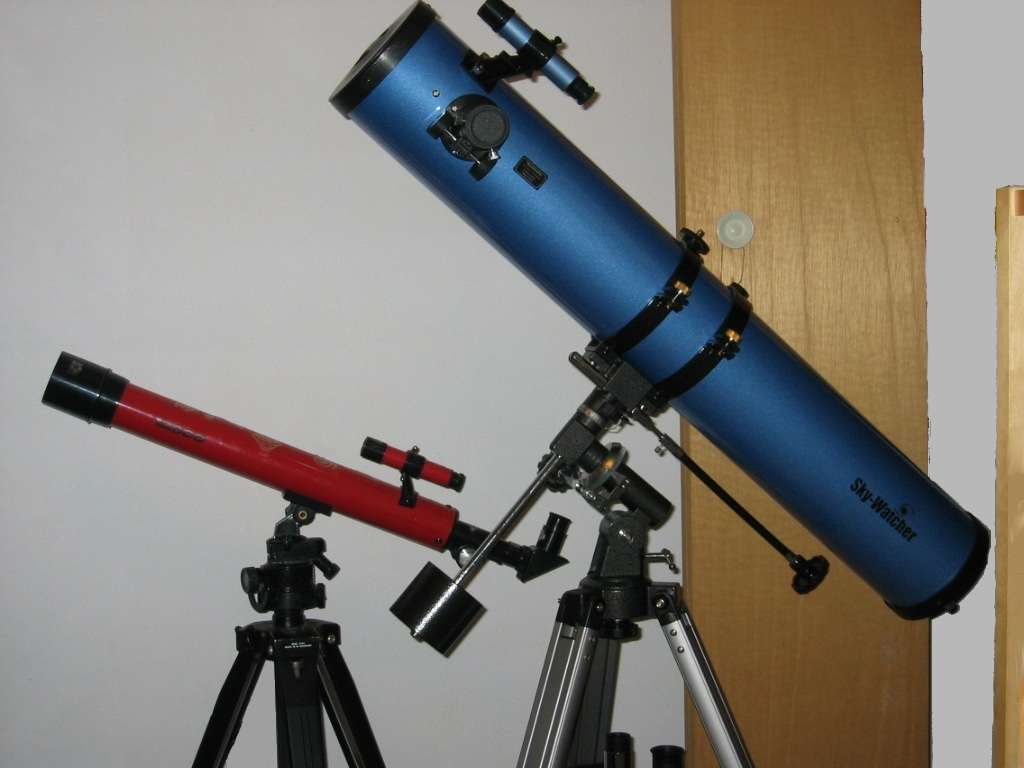
Sky-Watcher 114 mm EQ1 reflector (upper right) with Tasco refractor.

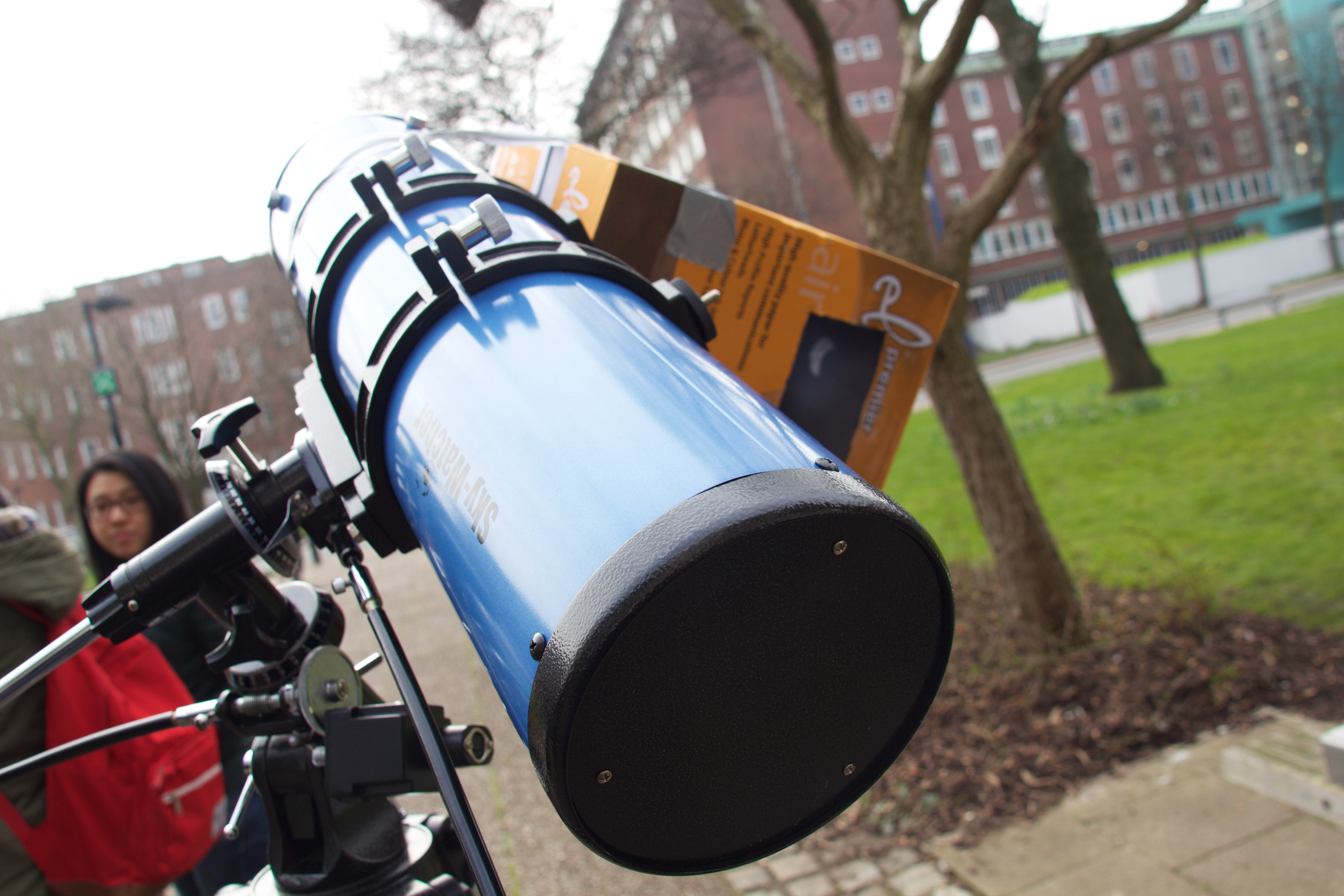
Using a Sky-watcher telescope to project the solar eclipse of March 20, 2015.

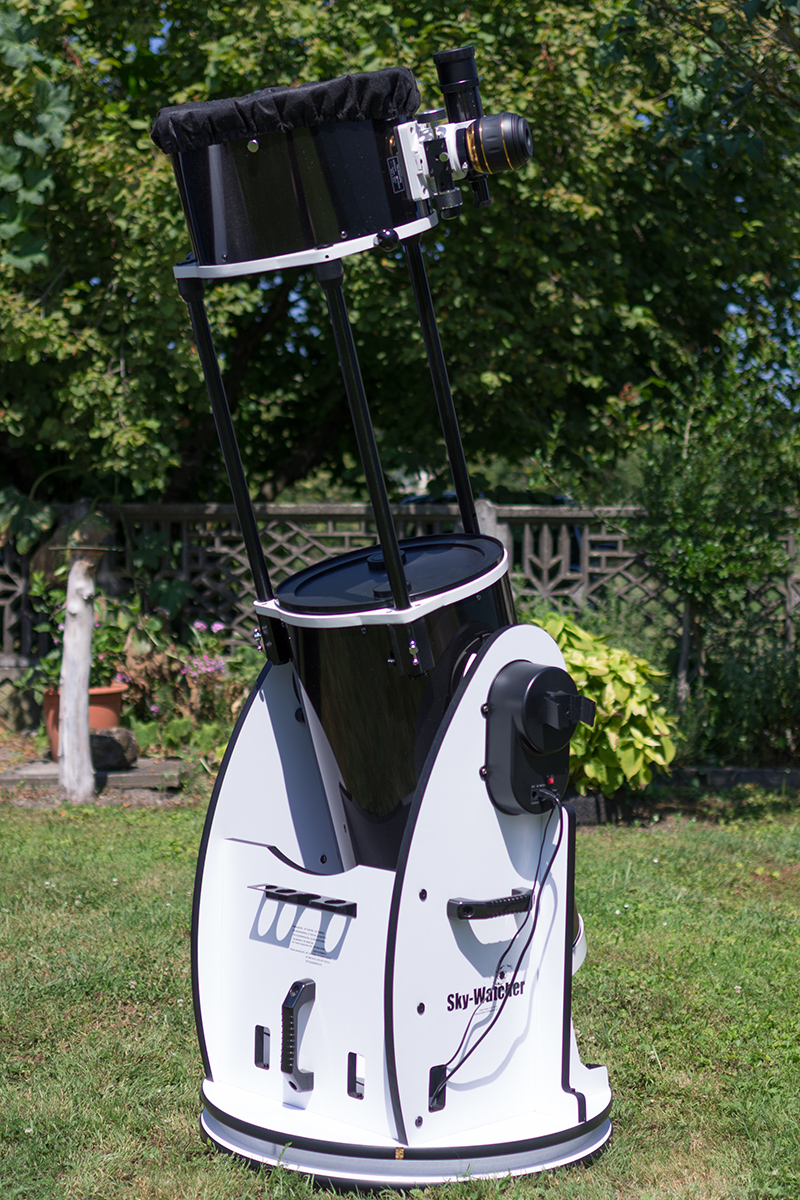
A Sky-Watcher Dobsonian telescope with a GoTo mount.
