= Blahová =

Blahová Sárrét
- Municipality
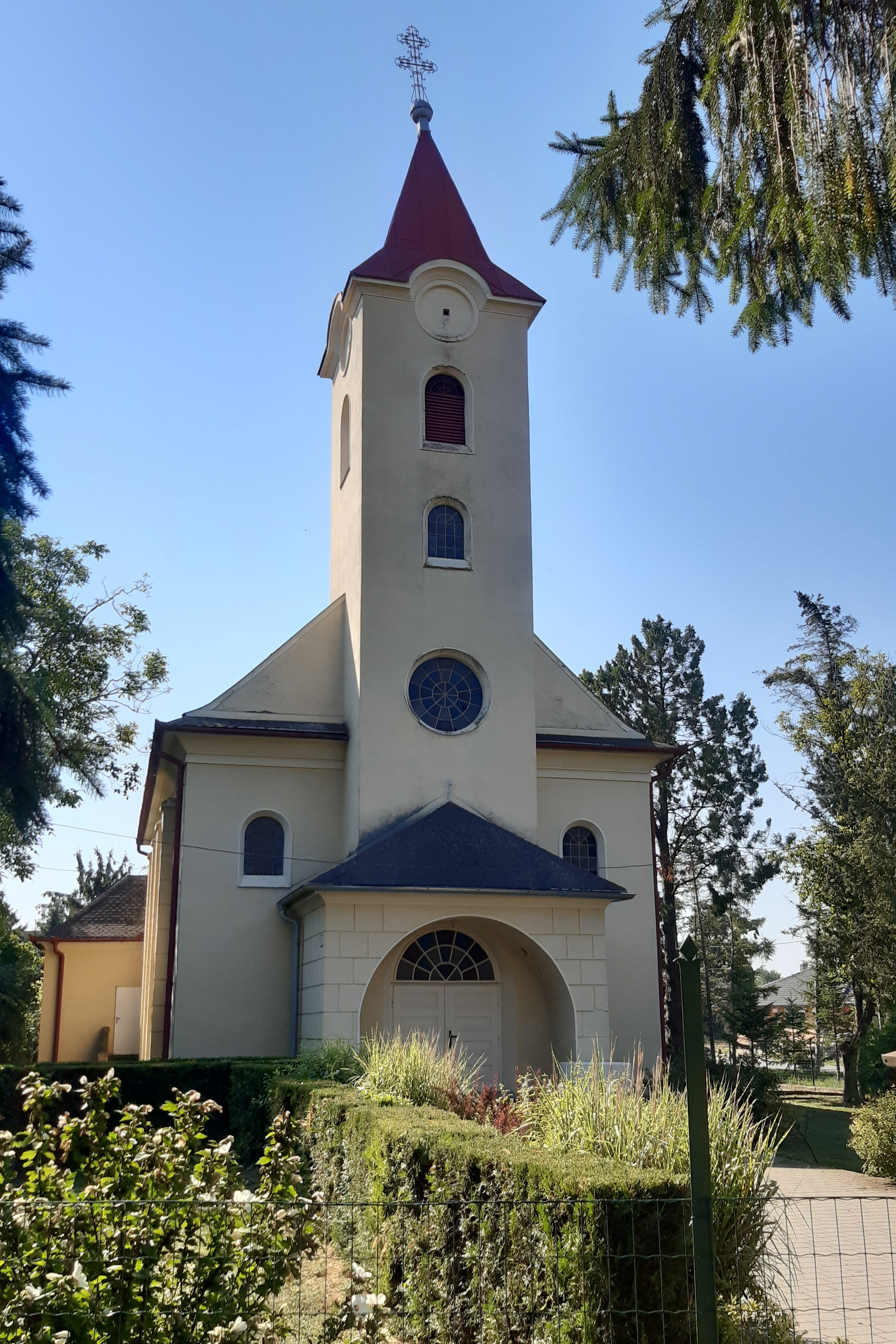

- Flag

- Location of Blahová in the Trnava Region Location of Blahová in Slovakia
- Coordinates: 48.08°N 17.54°E
- Country: Slovakia
- Region: Trnava Region
- District: Dunajská Streda District
- First mentioned: 1951

Government
  - Mayor: Natasa Rajcsányi

Area
  - Total: 11.37 km^{2} (4.39 sq mi)
- Elevation: 118 m (387 ft)

Population (2025)
  - Total: 468

Ethnicity
  - Hungarians: 52.09%
  - Slovaks: 43.73%
- Time zone: UTC+1 (CET)
  - Summer (DST): UTC+2 (CEST)
- Postal code: 930 52
- Area code: +421 31
- Vehicle registration plate (until 2022): DS
- Website: www.blahova.dcom.sk

Bláhová (Hungarian: Sárrét, lit. 'Mudfield', pronounced [ˈʃaːrːeːt]) is a village and municipality in the Dunajská Streda District in the Trnava Region of south-west Slovakia.

It has a post-office. There is a football playground and a public library in the village.

== Geography ==
The municipality lies at an altitude of 118 metres (387 ft) and covers an area of 11.37 km^{2} (4.39 sq mi) (2025).

== History ==
In the 9th century Great Moravian part, past year 906 the territory of Blahová became part of the Kingdom of Hungary. After the Austro-Hungarian army disintegrated in November 1918, Czechoslovak troops occupied the area, later acknowledged internationally by the Treaty of Trianon. Between 1938 and 1945 Blahová once more became part of Miklós Horthy's Hungary through the First Vienna Award. From 1945 until the Velvet Divorce, it was part of Czechoslovakia. Since then it has been part of Slovakia.

== Population ==
Population statistic (10 years)
Year	1995	2005	2015	2025
Count	375	378	358	468
Difference		+0.8%	−5.29%	+30.72%

Population statistic
Year	2024	2025
Count	434	468
Difference		+7.83%

It has a population of 468 people (31 December 2025).

=== Ethnicity ===
Census 2021 (1+ %)
Ethnicity	Number	Fraction
Slovak	224	62.22%
Hungarian	122	33.88%
Not found out	19	5.27%
Moravian	5	1.38%
Rusyn	4	1.11%
Total	360	

In year 2021 was 360 people by ethnicity 224 as Slovak, 122 as Hungarian, 19 as Not found out, 5 as Moravian, 4 as Rusyn, 3 as Czech, 2 as Austrian and 1 as Russian.

Note on population: The difference values of population numbers in the table "Population statistic" and in the sections "Ethnicity" & "Religion" is caused by the use of various statistical methods.

=== Religion ===
Census 2021 (1+ %)
Religion	Number	Fraction
Roman Catholic Church	204	56.67%
None	110	30.56%
Not found out	17	4.72%
Evangelical Church	15	4.17%
Eastern Orthodox Church	4	1.11%
Total	360	

In year 2021 was 360 people by religion 204 from Roman Catholic Church, 110 from None, 17 from Not found out, 15 from Evangelical Church, 4 from Eastern Orthodox Church, 3 from Greek Catholic Church, 1 from Calvinist Church, 1 from Paganism and natural spirituality, 1 from Jehovah's Witnesses, 1 from Czechoslovak Hussite Church, 1 from Church of Jesus Christ of Latter-day Saints, 1 from Baptists Church and 1 from Ad hoc movements.
