= Opticsplanet =

Privately held online retailer

OpticsPlanet, Inc.
- Type: Private
- Founded: 2000
- Headquarters: Northbrook, Illinois
- Key people: Mark Levitin, Founder and CEO; Pavel Shvartsman, Founder and President
- Products: shooting, hunting, camping, outdoor, military, law enforcement, eyewear, laboratory equipment

OpticsPlanet, Inc. is a privately held online retailer of shooting, hunting, military, law enforcement, eyewear, and laboratory equipment. The company is headquartered in Northbrook, Illinois, and operates a number of specialized online destinations, as well as its flagship store OpticsPlanet.com.

== History ==
After entering the optics industry as the exclusive North American wholesale distributor of LOMO products, Mark Levitin and Pavel Shvartsman launched OpticsPlanet in 1999 to build a direct-to-consumer e-commerce destination for optics, bootstrapping the company with their own private funding. They launched the flagship e-commerce site OpticsPlanet.com in 2000, and grew to achieve an annual revenue of over $163 million, and a staff of 300 employees. These figures led OpticsPlanet to be recognized as one of the United States Top 500 ecommerce sites by Internet Retailer Magazine. In 2011, 2018 and 2019 the company was listed as one of the “Top Workplaces” by Chicago Tribune.

== Viral kits ==
The company has obtained notoriety through the sales of various specialty kits, such as the Z.E.R.O. Zombie Kit, the Santa Stakeout Kit, and the Invisible Man Kit. These kits combine many of the items OpticsPlanet sells into a single package, and carry a price tag upwards of $24,000. Outlets such as Business Insider, Gizmodo and Fox News have all written about these kits.

== Wetley GGRX ==
In 2014, OpticsPlanet launched Wetley GGRX, the first company to offer prescription lens inserts for Google's Google Glass devices.

== See also ==
- List of Illinois companies
