= Tasco (company) =

American optics importer

- Company type: Corporation
- Industry: Technology
- Founded: 1954; 72 years ago
- Founder: George Rosenfield
- Headquarters: Miami, FL, United States
- Website: www.tasco.com

Tasco (also known as Tasco Worldwide) is a company which sells consumer telescopes. Tasco mainly imports telescopes for amateur astronomers but has expanded into other optical products, such as spotting scopes, microscopes, binoculars, telescopic sights, and other rifle accessories. Tasco sells via retail stores, catalogs, and online retailers. Tasco is based in Miramar, Florida. George Rosenfield founded the firm as the Tanross Supply Company in 1954. It started as a distributor of fishing tackle and hardware. The name was later shortened to Tasco as its offerings expanded to include binoculars and eyepieces.

== Products ==
=== Telescopes ===
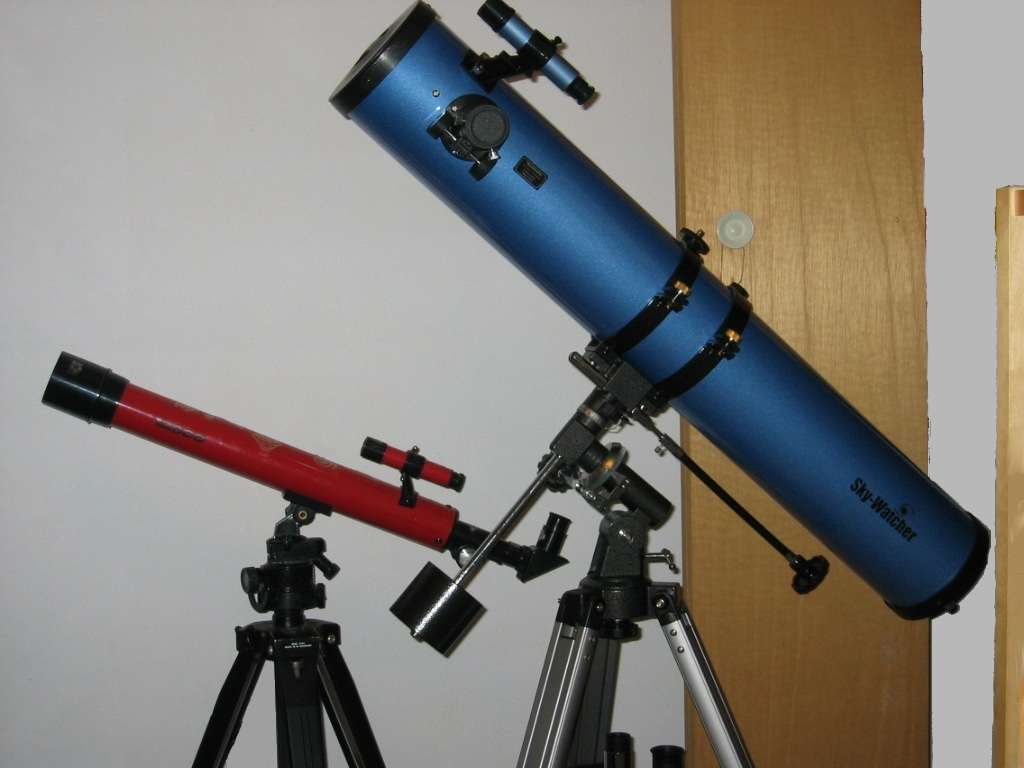
Department store 50 mm Tasco Specialty Refractor on modified mount (lower left) and a 114mm Sky-Watcher reflector.

Tasco's telescopes have a reputation as entry-level equipment. It is one of several companies advertising their products based on claims of high magnification, far beyond any attainable usable magnification. Tasco's telescopes tend to be referred to as "department store telescopes." They are generally considered low-cost instruments that appeal to impulse buyers.

=== Binoculars ===
Tasco imports binoculars with magnifications ranging between seven and ten power. They also offer Snapshot series binoculars, which include an ability to record video and capture still pictures as seen through the binoculars. Users can transfer images to a computer via a USB cable. Tasco provides software for viewing and printing photographs taken on its devices.

=== Gun sights ===
Tasco imports telescopic sights for rifles, and handguns featuring magnifications of 1 to 40 power. They also import non-magnifying red dot sights.

=== Spotting scopes ===
Tasco offers several spotting scopes. These scopes are designed for rugged outdoor use and feature rubber armor protection as well as optional camouflage. Models have magnifications between 12 and 45 times, and feature panoramic view finding.

== History ==
Tasco was founded by George Rosenfield in 1954. In March 1996, Rosenfield sold the business. At that time, Tasco employed 160 people at its Florida headquarters, and maintained a location in the state of Washington, which employed another 40.

In June 1998, Tasco purchased Celestron, another telescope manufacturer which focused on performance optical equipment and the more serious observer. Celestron was second only to Meade Instruments Corporation in sales of telescopes.

Early in 2001, Tasco began searching for a buyer as profits sank. Meade Corporation began negotiations for a merger, but the Federal Trade Commission blocked the attempt.

By June 2002, Wind Point Partners, then the parent company of Bushnell Performance Optics purchased the Tasco brand and all the company's intellectual property.

In July 2007, Wind Point Partners sold Bushnell Performance Optics along with Tasco property and sales rights to MidOcean Partners, a private equity firm based in New York and London.

On September 5, 2013, Alliant Techsystems announced it had entered into a definitive agreement to acquire Bushnell. Under the terms of the transaction, ATK paid $985 million in cash, subject to customary post-closing adjustments.

ATK spun-off Vista Outdoor upon closing its merger with Orbital Sciences and became Orbital ATK on February 9, 2015. Anyone holding ATK common stock at the end of the business day on February 2, 2015 received two shares of Vista Outdoor common stock. Eligible shareholders had their brokerage account credited or received a book-entry account statement reflecting their ownership. Vista Outdoor was thus initially 100% owned by ATK shareholders. Vista Outdoor stock traded on a "when-issued" basis from January 29, 2015 to February 9, 2015. It began "regular way" trading on the New York Stock Exchange on February 10, 2015 under the ticker symbol "VSTO." No payment or action of any kind was required of shareholders. This transaction was conducted on a tax-free basis. Shareholders subject to American taxes generally did not have to recognize a gain or loss for federal tax purposes.

== Litigation ==
On May 29, 2002, Tasco Worldwide initiated liquidation of all its assets after defaulting on nearly $30 million in loans. The company had been searching for a buyer for several months, but after much interest by Meade Instruments Corporation, the Federal Trade Commission, on this day, sanctioned a temporary restraining order in federal district court to preempt any attempt by Meade, the leading manufacturer of performance telescopes in the United States, to purchase all or certain assets of Tasco Holdings, Inc., including Celestron, a subsidiary and number two performance telescope provider in the U.S. The FTC argued that an acquisition by Meade of Celestron would negatively impact the performance telescope market by eliminating significant competition between the two companies and by creating a monopoly in the market for Schmidt-Cassegrain telescopes, which were only being sold in the U.S. by Celestron and Meade.

Later in 2002, Tasco and Celestron, then under the ownership of Bushnell Performance Optics, filed suits also in the District Court of California, alleging Meade products infringed on a United States patent entitled "Tripod Structure for Telescopes." Both companies sought injunctive relief and compensatory damages in an unspecified amount, and attorneys' fees and costs. In December 2002, the District Court denied the motions of both parties.
