= Celestron =

Manufacturing company

Celestron, LLC
- Type: Private
- Industry: Optical instruments
- Predecessor: Valor Electronics
- Founded: 1964; 62 years ago (as Celestron Pacific)
- Founder: Tom Johnson
- Headquarters: Torrance, California, United States
- Products: Telescopes and other optical / mechanical devices
- Website: Celestron.com

Celestron, LLC is a company that manufactures telescopes and distributes telescopes, binoculars, spotting scopes, microscopes, and accessories manufactured by its parent company, the Synta Technology Corporation of Taiwan.

== History ==
The predecessor of Celestron was Valor Electronics, an electronics and military components firm founded in 1955 by Tom Johnson. Johnson became involved with telescopes when he built a 6" reflecting telescope for his two sons. In 1960, Johnson established the "Astro-Optical" division of Valor, which would later become Celestron.

By 1964, Johnson had founded "Celestron Pacific" as a division of Valor Electronics offering Schmidt-Cassegrain telescopes from 4" to 22". In 1970 Celestron introduced its "C8" 8" diameter 2032 mm focal length, ƒ10 telescope, the first of a new line of telescopes built using methods developed by Celestron to produce Schmidt-Cassegrains at a high volume and low cost. These models made significant inroads into the amateur astronomical and educational communities.

Johnson, the founder of the company, sold Celestron in 1980. Celestron was acquired by Tasco in 1997 and almost went out of business when Tasco folded in 2001.

In early 2002 Celestron's rival, Meade Instruments, attempted a takeover but a bankruptcy court allowed the sale of the company back to its original owners. The company had been U.S. owned until April 2005 when it was acquired by SW Technology Corporation, a Delaware company and affiliate of Synta Technology Corporation of Taiwan. Synta is a manufacturer of astronomy equipment and related components and at that time had been a supplier for Celestron for over 15 years.

On March 13, 2012, Tom Johnson died at the age of 89.

== Products ==
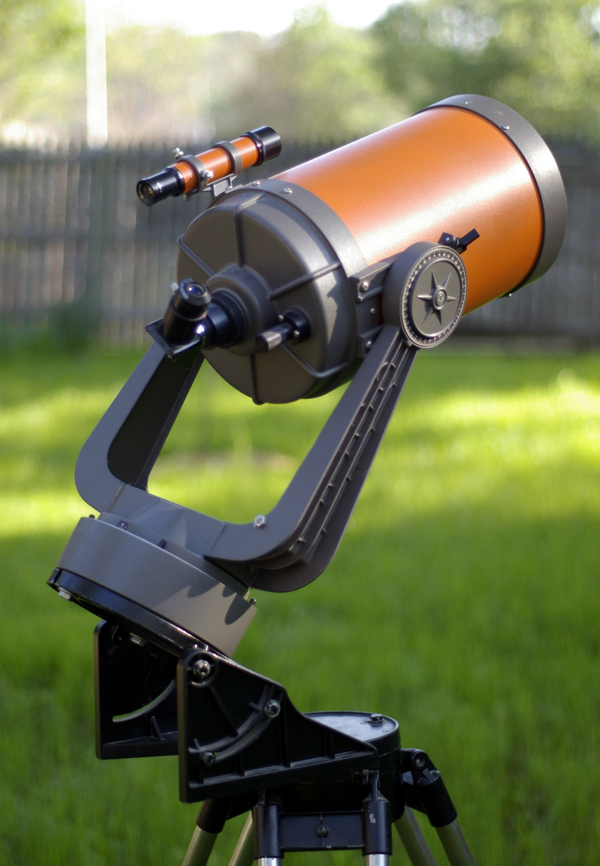
A vintage 1970s "orange tube" Celestron C8 telescope

Celestron was the first large scale commercial manufacturer of the Schmidt-Cassegrain telescope, introducing its "C8" 8" diameter 2032 mm focal length, ƒ10 telescope in 1970. The primary innovation Celestron/Tom Johnson devised was a method to produce Schmidt corrector plates using a vacuum to pull the glass blanks into a pre-shaped curve mold called a "master block" during the polishing process. This allowed for inexpensive mass production of corrector plates of uniform shape. The telescope line had a trademark matte orange tube (changed to glossy black in 1980, and back to semi-gloss orange in 2006), and double-fork equatorial mount, and became a popular large aperture, compact design.

Other telescope product lines include the CGE, CGEM, CPC, Origin, Evolution, NexStar, Omni, Onyx, AstroMaster, Ambassador, TravelScope, StarSense Explorer and PowerSeeker product lines. These range from large computerized reflectors with GPS to decorative/casual viewing telescopes with brass tube refractors on wood mounts.

Celestron products (as of 2026) include:

- 5", 6", 8", 9.25", 11", and 14" Schmidt-Cassegrain telescopes (the number denoting the aperture) on German equatorial mounts (all) or fork mounts (all excluding C14), with most benefiting from GoTo control.
- A range of 8", 9.25", 11", and 14" modified Schmidt-Cassegrains with a more advanced optical design marketed as EdgeHD
- A range of 6", 8", 11", and 36 cm Rowe-Ackermann Schmidt Astrographs (RASA)
- A range of 3.5 to 7-inch (180mm) Maksutov-Cassegrain telescopes
- A range of 2 to 6-inch (150 mm) refractor telescopes
- 4.5 to 12-inch (300 mm) traditional reflector telescopes on both German equatorial and Dobsonian mounts
- SkyScout – an astronomical sky finder or a personal planetarium
- Digital, Biological, and Stereo viewing microscopes
- Binoculars and Spotting scopes
- Various mounts
- Numerous eyepiece lines, including both simple Plossl and complex wide-field designs such as the X-Cel and Luminos eyepiece lines.
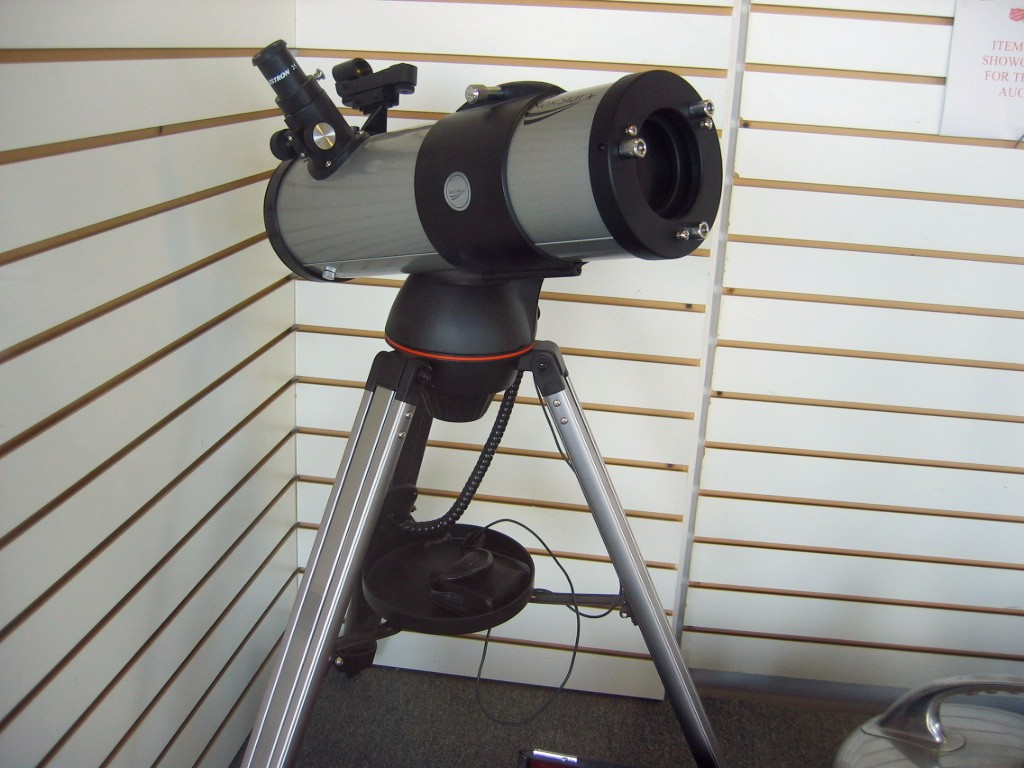
Celestron NexStar 114 telescope

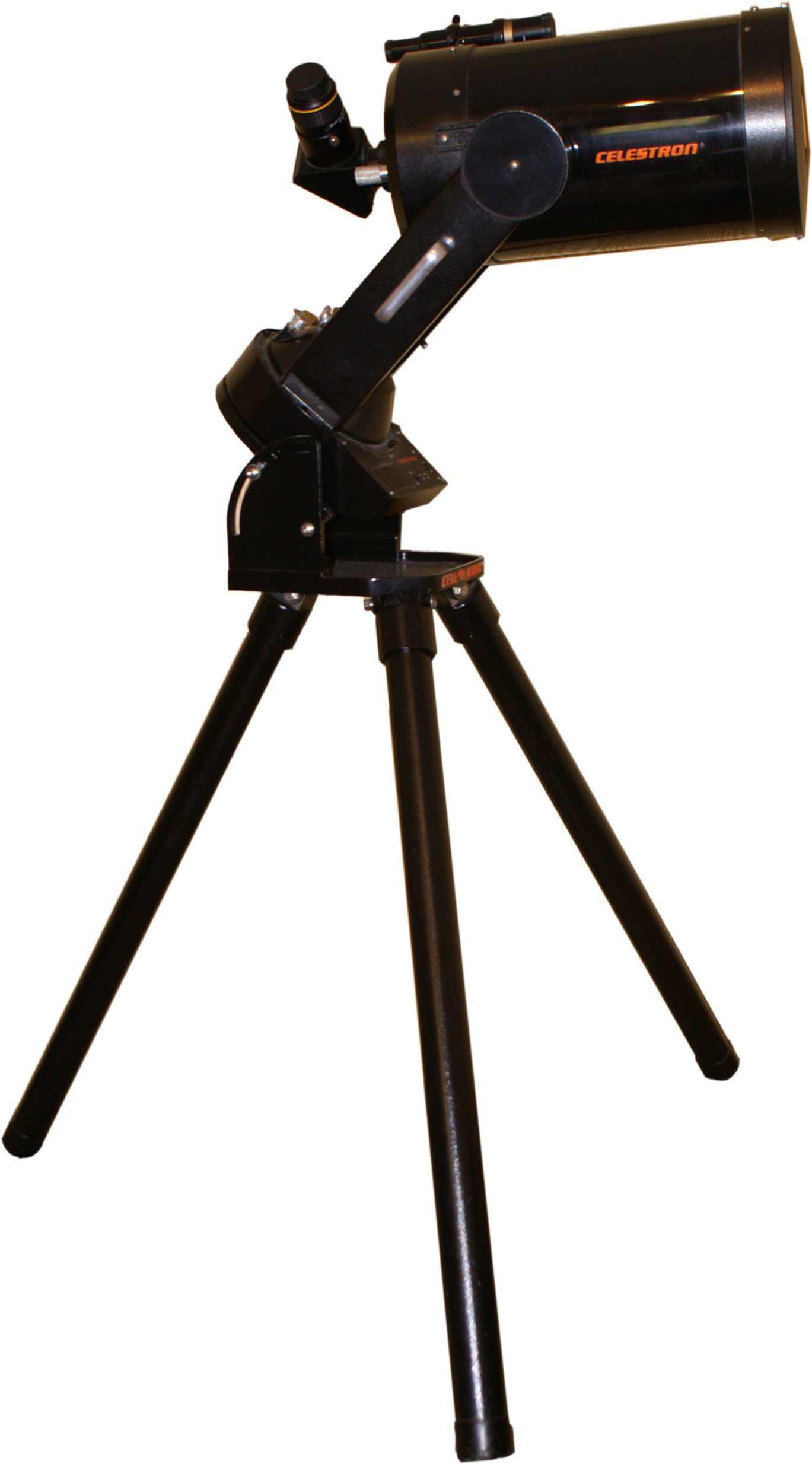
Celestron C8 telescope

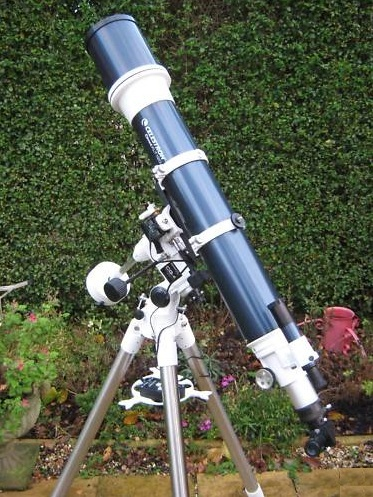
An Omni XLT120 achromatic refractor

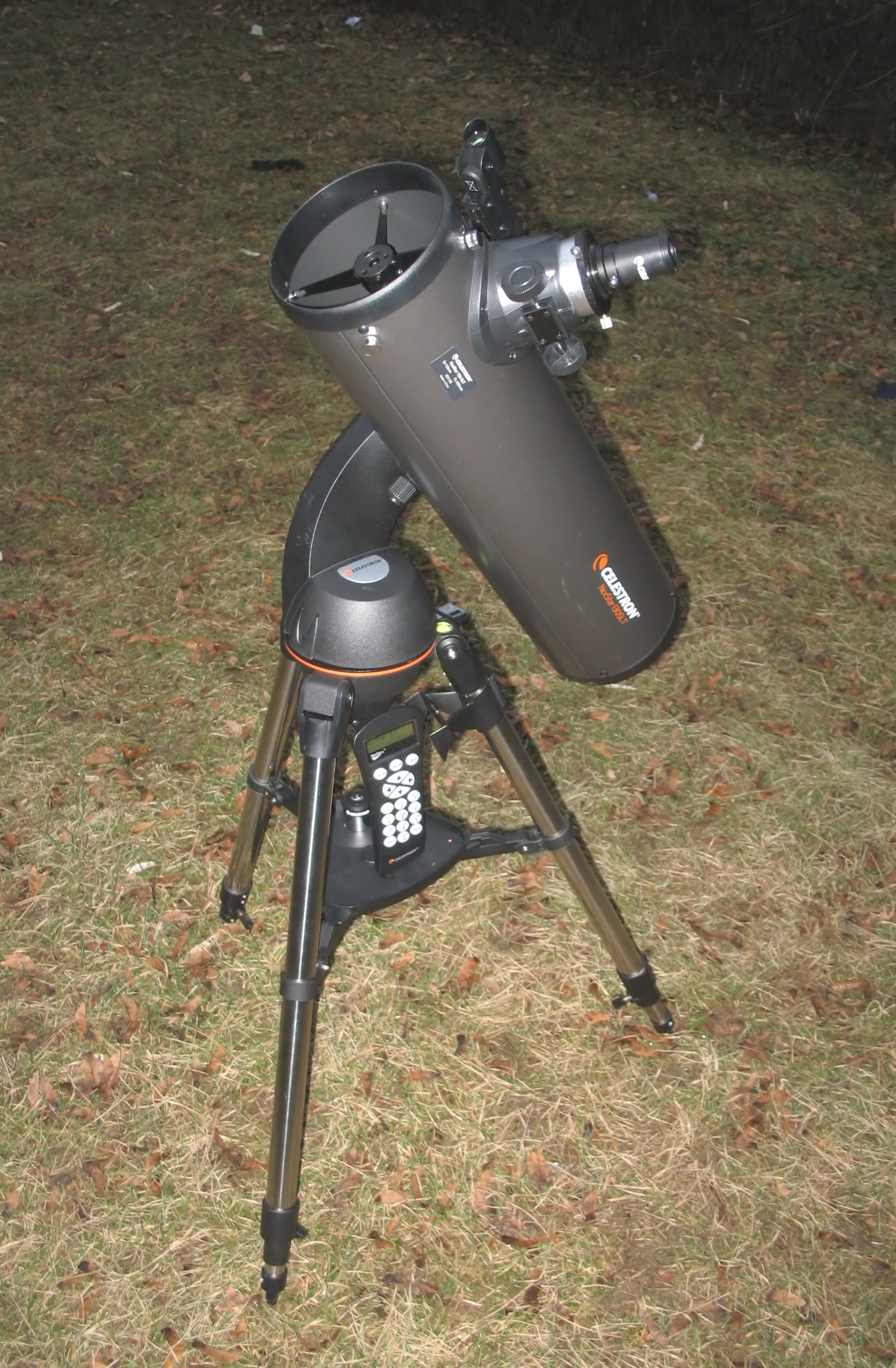
Celestron NexStar 130SLT Goto telescope

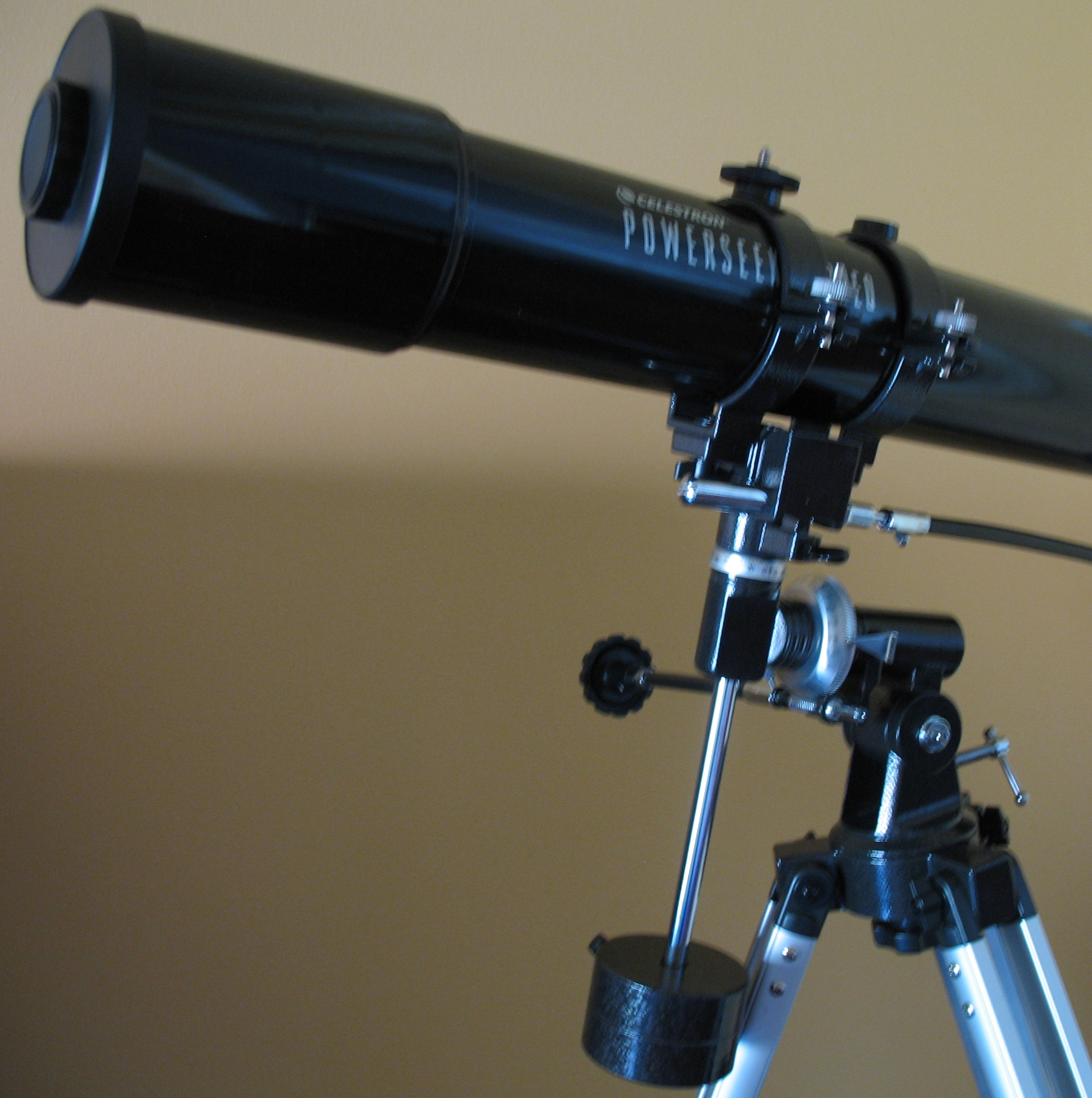
Celestron Powerseeker model 80EQ

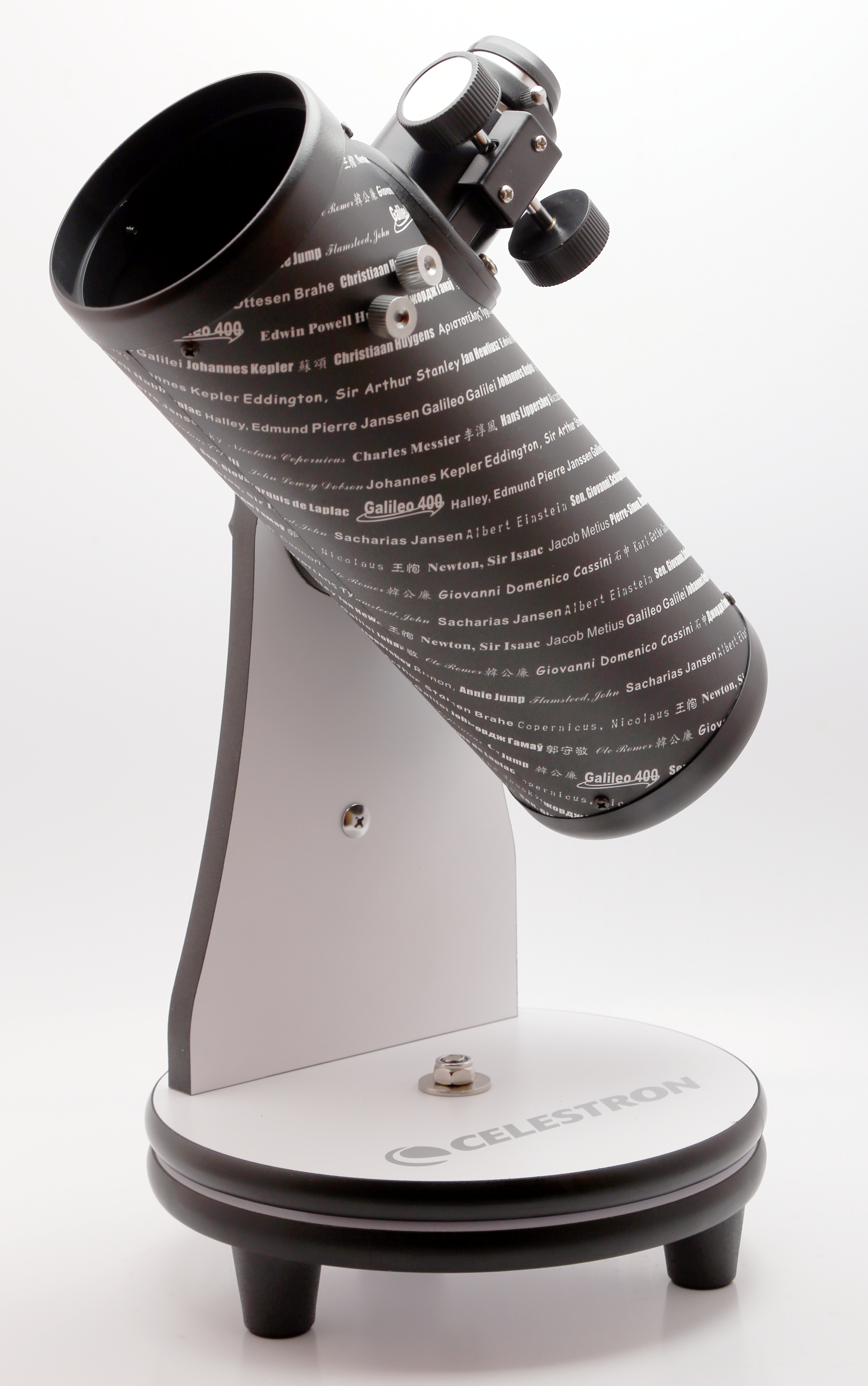
FirstScope 76 tabletop Dobsonian

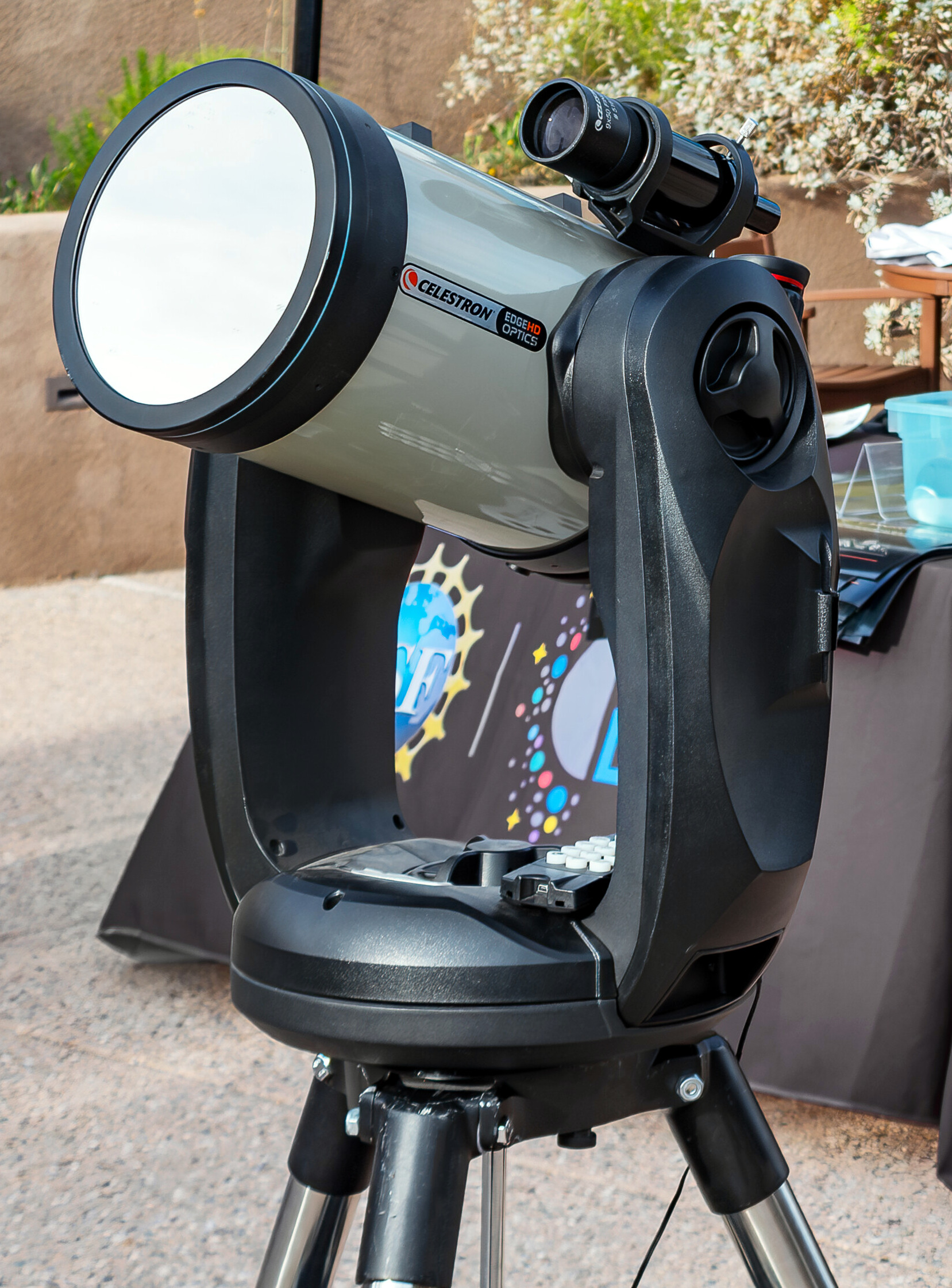
Celestron EdgeHD with solar filter

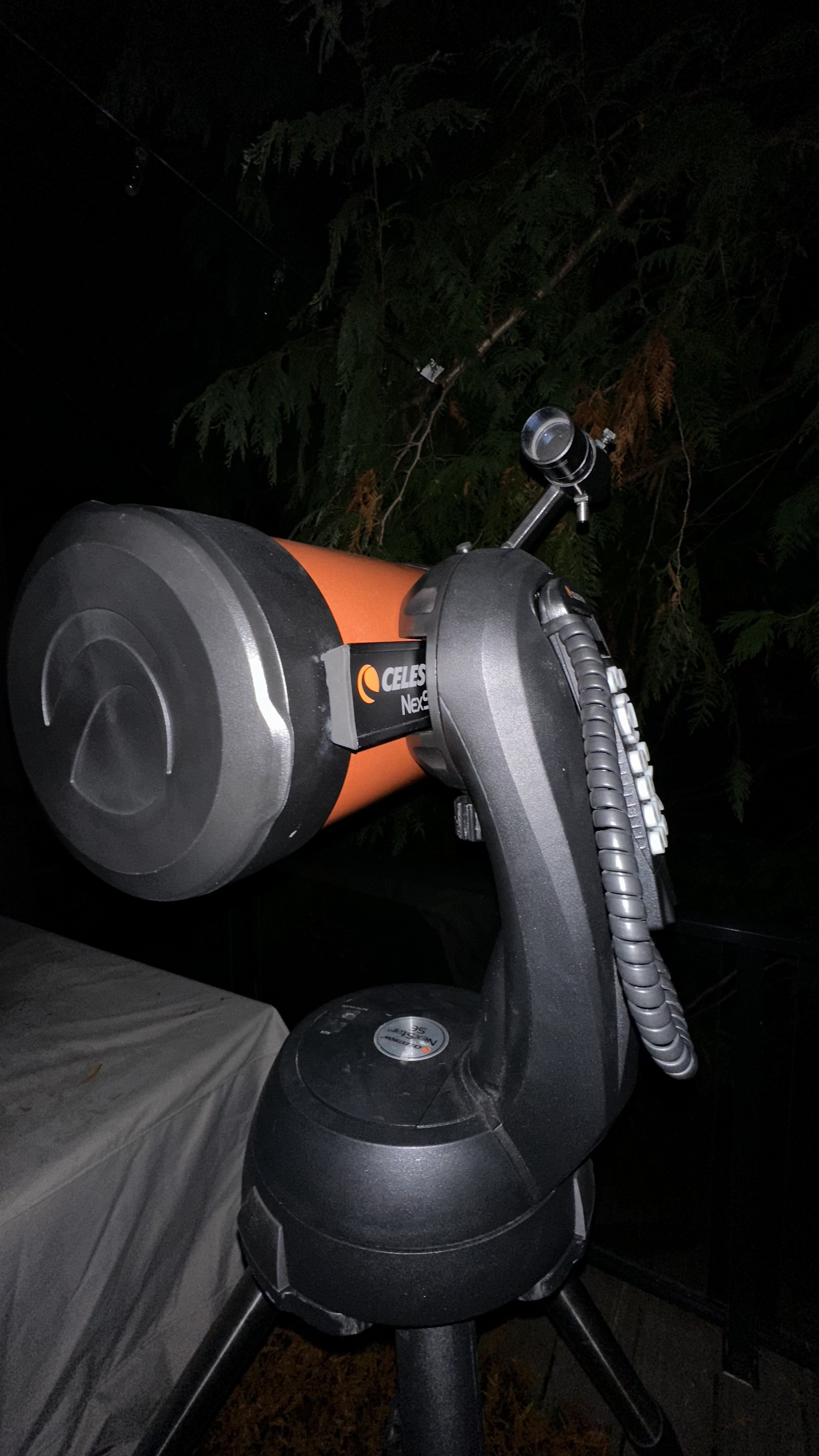
Celestron Nexstar 6SE Schmidt-Cassegrain Telescope

Celestron telescopes offer the option to use computerized location of astronomical objects as well as mounts that will aim themselves at any given object, a technology known as GoTo. Most of the computerized models can be connected to an external computer via an RS-232 cable, allowing them to be controlled by a third-party astronomy program or connected to a GPS receiver. GPS receivers are useful for programming the telescope with its precise location and time, which aids the alignment process required for GoTo. The Evolution and Origin series of telescopes can additionally be controlled remotely via the SkyPortal mobile application, and older mounts can utilize this function with a plug-in WiFi module.

Some motorized telescopes sold during the mid 80s to early 90s that used a form of GoTo technology, such as the Celestron Compustar, did not allow for dates after 2000, making some Celestron products susceptible to the Y2K bug. However, a third party chip to update the computer is available for some products.

== Competition with Meade ==
Since their founding in 1972, Meade Instruments has been one of Celestron's chief rivals. Design, sizing, introduction, and pricing of each company's products lines and models have been in response to their competition with each other. There has been litigation over infringement of patents between the two companies, one instance regarding GoTo technology. In September 2013, Sunny Optics Inc, a unit of the Chinese firm Ningbo Sunny Electronic Co Ltd, completed the acquisition of the entire share capital of Meade. Meade later declared bankruptcy and was bought by Orion Telescopes & Binoculars and is now an American company based in Watsonville, California.
